= HMS Roebuck (1743) =

Fifth-rate ship of the Royal Navy

History

Great Britain
- Name: Roebuck
- Ordered: 1 December 1742
- Cost: £11,518.3.5d including fitting
- Laid down: 2 January 1743
- Launched: 21 December 1743
- Completed: 15 February 1744
- Commissioned: December 1743
- Fate: Sold

General characteristics
- Class & type: fifth-rate two-decker
- Tons burthen: 708 22/94 (bm)
- Length: 126 feet 0 inches (38.4 m) (gundeck); 102 feet 6 inches (31.2 m) (keel)
- Beam: 36 feet 0 1/2 inch (11.0 m)
- Depth of hold: 15 feet 5 1/2 inches (4.7 m)
- Propulsion: Sails
- Sail plan: Fully Rigged Ship
- Complement: 280
- Armament: Lower deck: 20 × 18-pounder (8.2 kg); Upper deck: 20 × 9-pounder (4.1 kg); Quarterdeck: 4 × 6-pounder (2.7 kg)

HMS Roebuck was a 44-gun, fifth-rate sailing warship of the Royal Navy which carried a main battery of twenty 18-pounder (8.2 kg) long guns. Launched on 21 December 1743, she first served in the English Channel during the War of the Austrian Succession, which Britain entered the following March.

In 1744, part of a squadron under Admiral John Norris, Roebuck escorted a large convoy en route to Lisbon but became separated when she went in pursuit of an enemy vessel. She arrived in the Tagus after the convoy to find that Norris’ ships had already left for home. She was subsequently blockaded there by a French fleet until rescued on 9 September, after which, she transferred to the Mediterranean, joining Admiral William Rowley's fleet in operations against Genoa.

When the Seven Years' War began in 1756, Roebuck was sent to the West Indies, where she participated in the attack on Martinique in January 1759 and the capture of Guadeloupe in April. Roebuck paid off for the last time in August 1759. She was briefly hired out as a private warship but when she returned home in 1764, she was surveyed at Portsmouth and on 3 July, sold off.

== Construction and armament ==
Roebuck was one of the 1741 Establishment group of two-deck fifth-rates built for the Royal Navy. Originally ordered 1 December 1742 as a 40-gun ship, she was completed with 44 guns; 20 × 18-pounder (8.2 kg) guns on her lower deck, 20 × 9-pounder (4.1 kg) guns on her upper deck and 4 × 6-pounder (2.7 kg) guns on the quarterdeck. Her keel, 102 feet 6 inches (31.2 m) long, was laid down on 2 January 1743. As built, Roebuck was 126 feet 0 inches (38.4 m) long at the gundeck, had a beam of 36 feet 0 1/2 inch (11.0 m), and a depth in the hold of 15 feet 5 1/2 inches (4.7 m), making her 708 22/94 tons burthen.

== Service ==
Having cost the Admiralty £7,266.5.0d, Roebuck was launched on 21 December 1743. She was first commissioned under Captain Thomas Sturton and taken to Portsmouth, where she was finished at a further cost of £4,251.18.5d. Upon finishing, Roebuck joined the Channel Fleet under Admiral John Norris. Norris' fleet had left The Downs early on 7 March 1744, having received word that 15 French ships out of Brest were off Dungeness. Contrary wind and tide forced the British to anchor within sight of their enemy, where at 11:00 they were joined by Roebuck from Portsmouth. At about 01:00 the following morning, a storm blew up which continued for much of the day, breaking cables and scattering the fleet. Roebuck remained at anchor but lost one of her boats. The storm broke that evening but the French, by that time, had already gone. Although France and Great Britain were technically at peace, a declaration of war was expected at any time and the possibility of invasion from a large fleet of French transports at Dunkirk kept Norris from pursuing.

Norris wanted to retain enough ships to attack the French at Dunkirk should an opportunity present itself but ships were also needed to escort 6,000 Dutch troops from Willemstadt. In addition Admiral Thomas Mathews' fleet in the Mediterranean was desperately short of supplies and the victualing fleet at Spithead was unable to move while the French were still at large. Norris, required to divide his forces but wanting to prevent the Channel Fleet from becoming too depleted, decided that eight of his most powerful vessels, under the command of Captain Charles Hardy would chaperone Mathews' supplies only as far as Brest. Two fifth-rates, Roebuck and HMS Preston, would then take the convoy the rest of the way. The order was later amended; Roebuck and Preston would take the transports only as far as the Tagus, with Mathews left to arrange the remainder of the journey.

The convoy was due to sail on 5 April, but foul weather delayed departure until 10 April. Progress was slow due to the lack of wind and in due course the fleet was forced to anchor once more. When the wind returned, it was blowing the wrong way. On 13 April, Hardy received unconfirmed news that the French ships at Brest had put to sea. A lightly protected convoy travelling to Lisbon would now be vulnerable to attack. On 23 April, the Admiralty issued new orders: Hardy was to send a ship ahead to look into Brest and, if the rumour proved to be true, his whole squadron was to escort the convoy to Lisbon but if it were false, he need only take the convoy passed this dangerous area and leave Roebuck and Preston to accompany it the remainder of the journey. The former proved to be the case and so, on 4 May 1744, Roebuck and Preston, with the ships-of-the-line HMS Victory, Duke, Sandwich, St George, Princess Royal, Cornwall, Shrewsbury, Princess Amelia, escorted the convoy up the Channel.

Roebuck became separated from the convoy, when she went in pursuit of, and eventually captured an 18-gun Spanish vessel, 150 nautical miles (280 kilometres) west of Cape Finisterre. She arrived in Lisbon with her prize on 17 May to find the convoy already there, having arrived three days previous, and Hardy's squadron, its orders fulfilled, having left for Spithead. (Note: Newberry's The Lives of the British Admirals states that Hardy's squadron was blockaded in the Tagus with the convoy) The convoy, plus five other ships sent by Mathews as an escort for the final leg, were later blockaded by the Brest fleet and had to be rescued on 9 September, by a combined force of 25 British and Dutch ships under Sir John Balchen. The French were forced to seek refuge in Cádiz and were there themselves blockaded.

=== Mediterranean service ===
Roebuck subsequently joined Admiral William Rowley's fleet in the Mediterranean, where on 31 October 1744, she was despatched with Stirling Castle, Guernsey and Chatham to watch the Spanish in Cádiz while the rest of Rowley's ships escorted a large flotilla of merchant vessels. In September 1745 she was attached to a small squadron comprising the fifth rates HMS Liverpool and Feversham, the sixth rates Seaford and Kennington, two bomb ketches and two other smaller vessels, with orders to watch Toulon, patrol the coast of Genoa and prevent supplies being transferred between Naples and the Adriatic or along the coast of Italy. Roebuck spent some time at anchor in the port of Leghorn while the powerful ships-of-the-line bombarded the city of Genoa; leaving on 12 October to rejoin the main fleet.

In December 1746, Roebuck, then under the command of Captain John Weller, delivered cannon to the army of Maximilian Ulysses Browne while it lay siege to Antibes. Roebuck remained as part of the blockading fleet under Vice Admiral Henry Medley. On 1 February the Austrians withdrew, fearing an attack from a large force under the Duc de Belle-Isle. Browne also thought the siege ineffective, suggesting the town was being resupplied whenever foul weather blew the blockading ships off station. No longer required, Medley's fleet was reassigned to keeping the Spanish fleet bottled up in Cartagena while Roebuck and some smaller craft were left to protect the islands of Sainte Marguerite and Saint Honorat, occupied at that time by Britain's Austrian allies. On 18 February several small craft were seen on the Cannes shore and Wellard sent in a barca-longa and two feluccas to destroy them. French troops gathered on the beach to protect their boats but the British managed to capture six and destroy many others without losing a man. Four days later, another large force assembled on the shore, this time with artillery, which it was supposed was for an assault on the castle on Sainte Marguerite. Wellard ordered another attack, which came under heavy fire when the cannon on the beach were turned against his modest squadron. Roebuck however soon put the batteries out of action and forced the enemy to retreat. The barca-longa had to retire, being in danger of sinking but Roebuck kept up her bombardment until it was too dark to continue. In the process, she received some thirty shot to her hull and much damage to her spars and rigging; six of her crew were killed and 14 wounded. To prevent further attempts, Captain George Townsend, at that time commanding a squadron off Provence, was ordered to extend his patrol to include the islands.

When the war ended in October 1748, Roebuck was paid off. She returned to England, where she was surveyed in November. Repairs started in April 1750 at Deptford which took five years and cost the Admiralty £3,128.19.9d. By the time the ship had been refitted at Woolwich, the costs had risen to £8,189.5.2d. Roebuck was brought back into service in July 1755 under Captain Matthew Whitwell.

=== The Leeward Station ===
In December 1756, Roebuck was on the Jamaica Station, under the command of Captain John Hollwall, who later took her to the Leeward Islands. In 1757, Roebuck transported Commander-in-Chief of the Jamaica Station, Vice-Admiral George Townsend to England, arriving at Spithead on 17 July. Hollwell was superseded by Captain Thomas Lynn, who returned the ship to Jamaica in December.

Roebuck was present for the attack on Martinique in 1759. To facilitate attacks on French possessions in the Caribbean, the Leeward Squadron was joined by eight ships-of-the-line and transports containing 4,400 troops under the command of Lieutenant Colonel Peregrine Hopson. The reinforcements arrived in Barbados from England in January. Commodore Sir John Moore retained command of naval operations and the force set sail on 13 January, arriving two days later in Fort-Royal Bay. At 08:00 on 16 January, Roebuck with HMS Winchester and Woolwich, opened fire on the batteries in Cas des Navieres Bay, where it was intended to land the troops. At the same time, HMS Bristol and Rippon attacked Fort Negro, three miles away. The battery at Cas des Navieres was silenced when the magazine exploded, but Roebuck and the others continued to fire at the shore so the enemy was unable to form up and oppose a landing. The squadron kept up its salvo for much of the following day and provided covering fire when the troops landed at 16:00. Without access to drinking water, and out-numbered by 10,000 French troops and militia, the British were later forced to withdraw and, after a short bombardment of Saint-Pierre on 19 January, it was decided to abandon the invasion altogether and instead attack Guadeloupe.

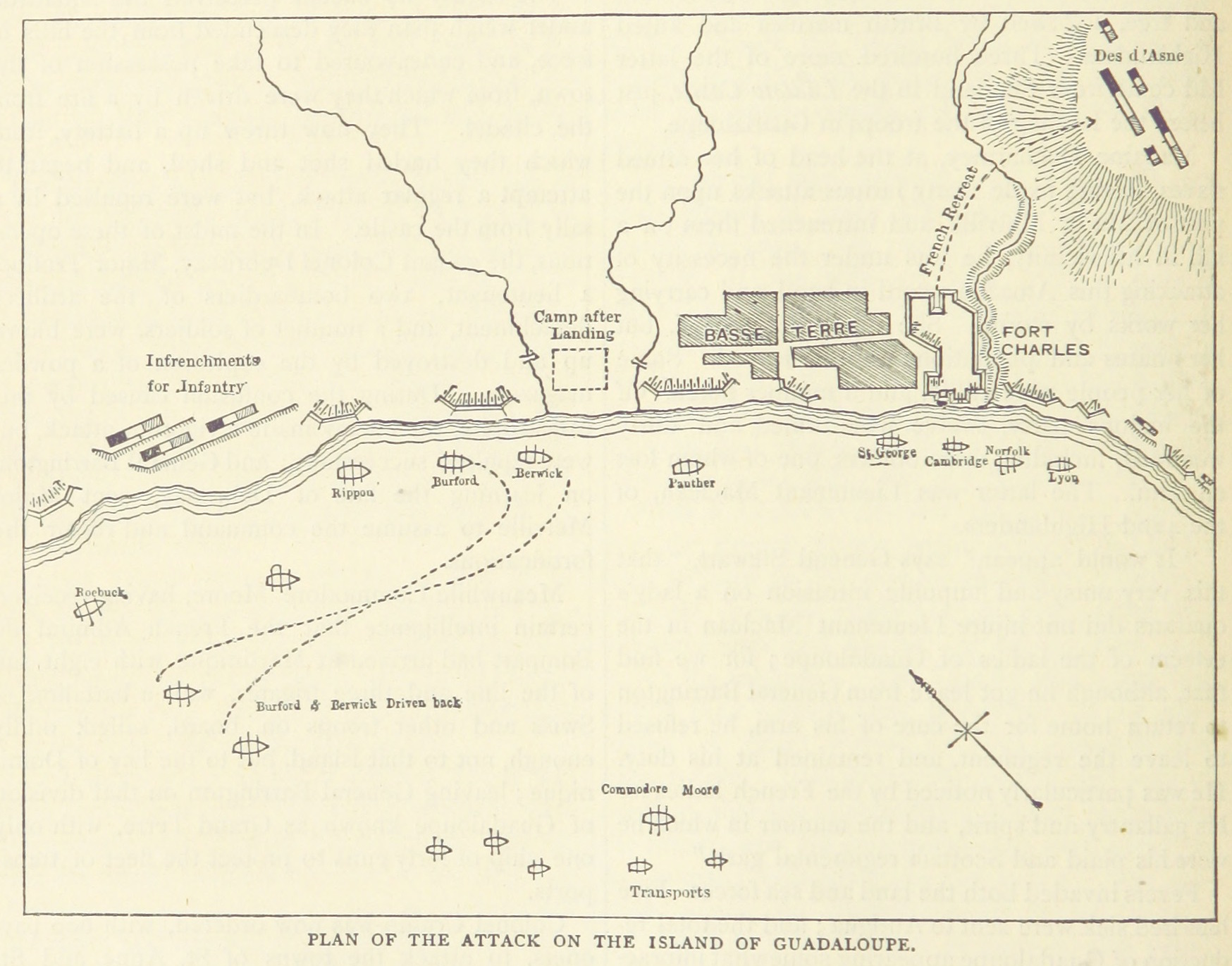
Plan of the assault on Basse-Terre on 23 January 1759, showing Roebuck attacking batteries to the west of the town.

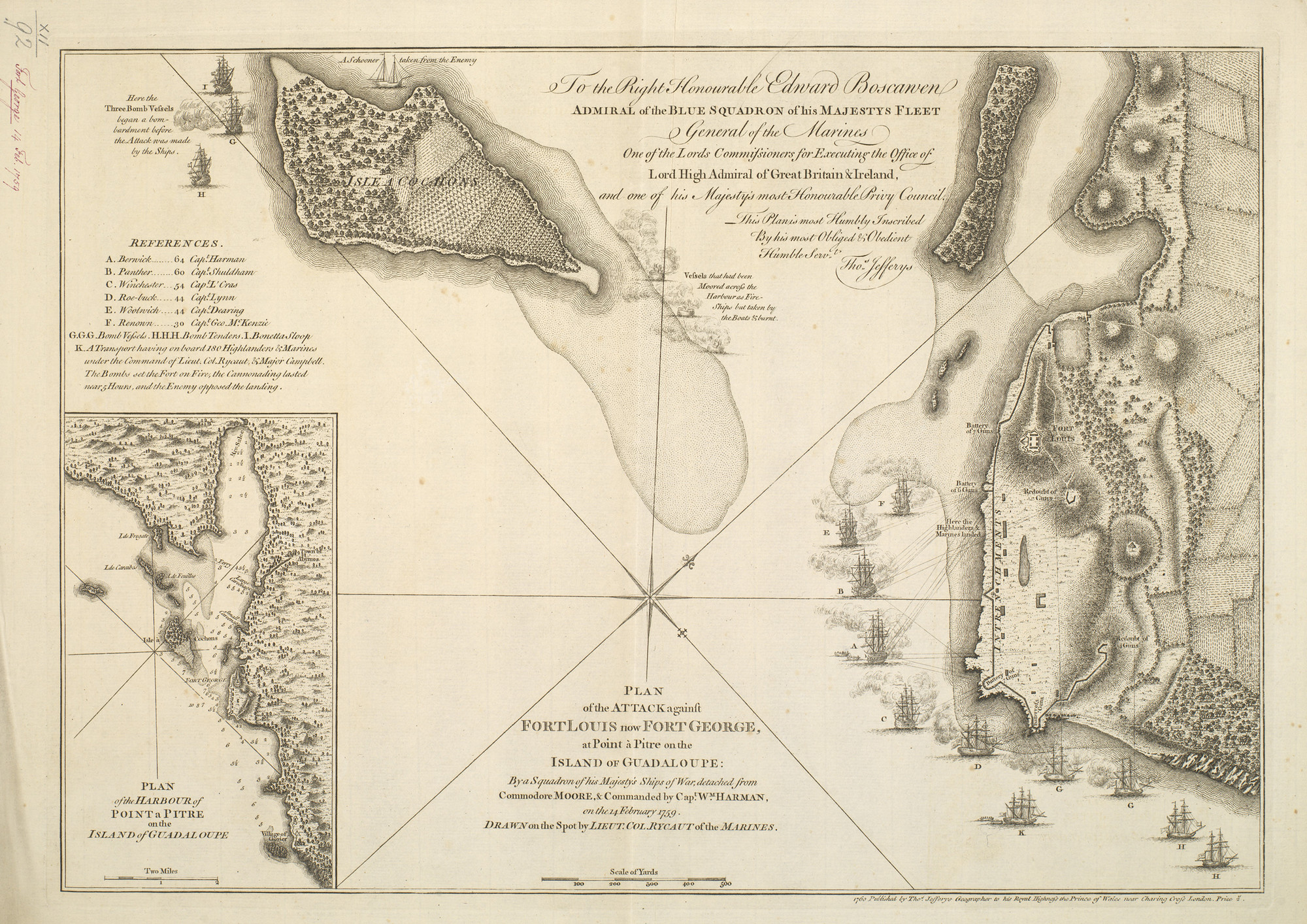
Plan of the attack on 14 February 1759, with Roebuck engaging the guns on the southern corner of Fort Louis.

The British force arrived off Basse-Terre at midday on 22 January and began their attack the following morning. Moore took eight of his largest ships, of between 60 and 90 guns, in to cannonade the enemy batteries and citadel. When the 60-gun Rippon grounded, Roebuck and Bristol were required to sail in and rescue her. By 17:00 the French guns had been put out of action. At 22:00, four bomb ketches began to shell the town. The bombardment continued throughout the night, causing a fire which swept through town destroying buildings and the interior of the citadel. On 24 January, troops were landed which quickly occupied Basse-Terre but were unable to capture the governor, who escaped into the mountains. Instead of pursuing however, Hopson decided to consolidate his position and by 30 January, 1,500 of his men had succumbed to disease. On 13 February, Moore sent Roebuck with Berwick, Woolwich, Renown and two bomb ketches to attack Fort Louis, at Point à Pitre, on the Grande Terre side of the island. After a six-hour bombardment, Royal Marines and Highlanders were landed, who occupied the town and fort.

On 11 March, Moore received news of a French squadron comprising eight ships-of-the-line and three large frigates. While Roebuck was left to guard the transports, Moore gathered his ships and set sail for Prince Rupert's Bay, Dominica where he was able to resupply and was best placed to monitor the enemy's movements.

After three months of sporadic fighting, on 22 April, the Governor of Guadeloupe eventually offered to surrender. It was accepted by Major General John Barrington, Hopson having died from a tropical illness at the end of February, and terms were agreed on 25 April.

== Non-naval service and fate ==
Roebuck paid off for the last time in August 1759. She was hired out as a foreign, private warship from June 1762 until January 1764. On her return, she was surveyed then sold at Portsmouth for £560.0.0d on 3 July.

== Notes ==
Differences between dates quoted in text and in contemporary sources are due to the adoption of the Gregorian calendar in 1752. A bill, passed by the British Parliament in May, meant that Wednesday 2 September 1752, was followed by Thursday 14 September and New Year's Day changed from 25 March to 1 January.
