= List of ship launches in 1749 =

The list of ship launches in 1749 includes a chronological list of some ships launched in 1749.

Date	Ship	Class	Builder	Location	Country	Notes
19 January	Nusretnüma	Fifth rate		Constantinople	Ottoman Empire	For Ottoman Navy.
15 February	Hercule	Third rate	Françcois-Guillaume Clairan des Lauriers	Brest	Kingdom of France	For French Navy.
26 February	Fenix	Third rate		Havana	(Spain) Cuba	For Spanish Navy.
7 March	Magnifique	Third rate	Jacques-Luc Coulomb	Brest	Kingdom of France	For French Navy.
7 March	Woolwich	Fourth rate	Moody Janverin & John Darley	Bucklers Hard	Great Britain	For Royal Navy.
28 April	Hermione	Sixth rate		Rochefort	Kingdom of France	For French Navy.
10 May	Orphée	Third rate	Joseph Véronique Charles Chapelle	Toulon	Kingdom of France	For French Navy.
date	San Michiel Arcangelo	San Michiel Arcangelo-class ship of the line	Piero Moro	Venice	Republic of Venice	For Venetian Navy.
22 May	Mermaid	Sixth rate	Henry Adams	Bucklers Hard	Great Britain	For Royal Navy.
28 June	Fénix	Third rate	Pedro de Torres	Havana	(Spain) Cuba	For Spanish Navy.
28 June	Rayo	Rayo-class ship of the line		Havana	(Spain) Cuba	For Spanish Navy.
30 June	Soleil-Royal	Ship of the line	Jacques-Luc Coulomb	Brest	Kingdom of France	For French Navy.
4 July	Fowey	Sixth rate	Moody Janverin	Lepe	Great Britain	For Royal Navy.
4 July	Wasp	Sloop of war	Peirson Lock	Portsmouth Dockyard	Great Britain	For Royal Navy.
5 July	Hippopotame	Fourth rate	François Coulomb	Toulon	Kingdom of France	For French Navy.
24 July	Giglio d'Oro	San Michiel Arcangelo-class ship of the line	Piero Moro	Venice	Republic of Venice	For Venetian Navy.
26 July	Peggy	Sloop of war	John Holland	Deptford Dockyard	Great Britain	For Royal Navy.
28 July	Amphion	Ship of the line	Jacques-Luc Coulomb	Brest, France	Kingdom of France	For French Navy.
3 August	Rochester	Fourth rate		Deptford Dockyard	Great Britain	For Royal Navy.
19 September	Chariot Volant	Fifth rate	Pierre Chaillé Fils	Havre de Grâce	Kingdom of France	For French Navy.
3 October	Hazard	Sloop of war	Pierson Lock	Portsmouth Dockyard	Great Britain	For Royal Navy.
15 November	Orford	Third rate	John Hollond & Thomas Fellowes	Woolwich Dockyard	Great Britain	For Royal Navy.
29 November	Hind	Sixth rate	Chitty & Vernon	Chichester	Great Britain	For Royal Navy.
23 December	Le Duc de Chartres	East Indiaman	Gilles Chambry	Lorient	Kingdom of France	For Compagnie des Indes.
24 December	Téméraire	Third rate	Pierre-Blaise Coulomb	Toulon	Kingdom of France	For French Navy.
December	Culloden	Hoy	Cleveland	Plymouth	Great Britain	For Royal Navy.
Unknown date	Hawk	Sloop		Bombay	India	For Bombay Pilot Service.
Unknown date	Huis ten Bosch	Sixth rate		Amsterdam	Dutch Republic	For Dutch Navy.
Unknown date	Couronne	Ship of the line		Rochefort	Kingdom of France	For French Navy.
Unknown date	London	East Indiaman		London	Great Britain	For British East India Company.
Unknown date	Lord Anson	East Indiaman		London	Great Britain	For private owners.
Unknown date	Nesbit	Full-rigged ship		Bombay	India	For private owner.
Unknown date	Roman Emperor	Full-rigged ship		River Thames	Great Britain	For private owner
Unknown date	Seahorse	Sloop		Bombay	India	For Bombay Pilot Service.
Unknown date	Suffolk	East Indiaman			Great Britain	For British East India Company.
