= Sir Peter Parker, 1st Baronet =

Royal Navy officer and politician (1721–1811)

Admiral of the Fleet Sir Peter Parker Bt
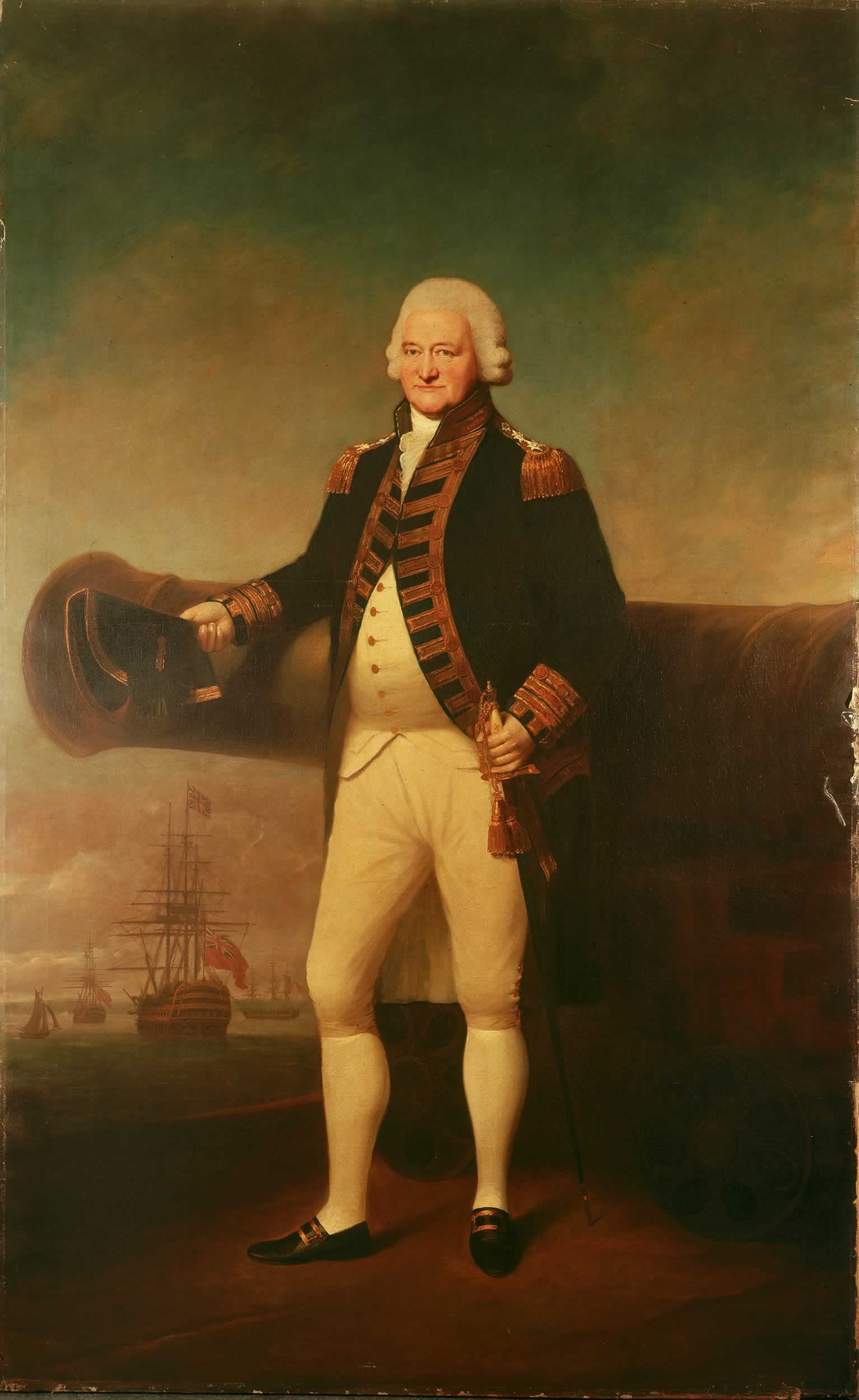
- Portrait by Lemuel Francis Abbott, c. 1799
- Born: 1721; Ireland
- Died: 21 December 1811 (aged 89-90); Weymouth Street, London
- Burial place: St Margaret's, Westminster
- Military career
- Allegiance: Great Britain; United Kingdom
- Branch: Royal Navy
- Service years: 1743–1763; 1773–1811
- Rank: Admiral of the Fleet
- Commands: HMS Margate; HMS Woolwich; HMS Bristol; HMS Buckingham; HMS Terrible; HMS Barfleur; Jamaica Station; Portsmouth Command
- Conflicts: War of Jenkins' Ear; War of the Austrian Succession; Seven Years' War; American Revolutionary War: Battle of Sullivan's Island (WIA)

Admiral of the Fleet Sir Peter Parker, 1st Baronet (1721 – 21 December 1811) was a Royal Navy officer and politician. As a junior officer, he was deployed with a squadron under Admiral Edward Vernon to the West Indies at the start of the War of Jenkins' Ear. He saw action again at the Battle of Toulon during the War of the Austrian Succession. As captain of the fourth-rate HMS Bristol he took part in the Invasion of Guadeloupe during the Seven Years' War.

As a commodore, he was deployed to the North American Station, to provide naval support for an expedition led by General Sir Henry Clinton reinforcing loyalists in the Southern Colonies at an early stage of the American Revolutionary War. He led a naval attack against the fortifications on Sullivan's Island (later called Fort Moultrie after their commander), protecting Charleston, South Carolina. However, after a long and hard-fought battle, Parker was forced to call off the attack, having sustained heavy casualties, including the loss of a ship. He subsequently served under Lord Howe in the invasion and capture of New York City and commanded the squadron that captured Long Island and Rhode Island.

Parker went on to be Commander-in-Chief, Jamaica, before being returned as Member of Parliament for Seaford and then as member for Maldon. He later became Commander-in-Chief, Portsmouth.

== Early career ==
Born the third son of Rear-Admiral Christopher Parker, Parker joined the Royal Navy at an early age. Promoted to commander on 17 March 1735, he was deployed with a squadron under Admiral Edward Vernon to the West Indies in 1739 at the start of the War of Jenkins' Ear.

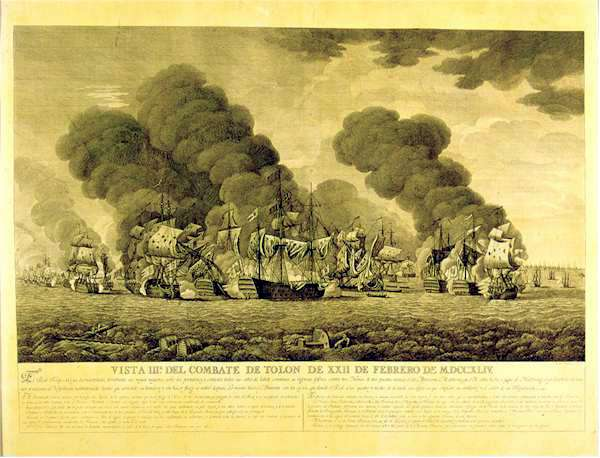
The Battle of Toulon at which Parker was present as a junior officer

Parker transferred to the second-rate HMS Russell and then to the bomb vessel HMS Firedrake in the Mediterranean Fleet and saw action again during the War of the Austrian Succession. He was moved to the second-rate HMS Barfleur, flagship of Rear-Admiral William Rowley, in January 1744 and took part in the Battle of Toulon in February 1744, before transferring to the second-rate HMS Neptune, flagship of Vice-Admiral Richard Lestock, in March 1744 and returning to England. Promoted to captain on 6 May 1747, he became commanding officer of the sixth-rate HMS Margate later that month and was deployed protecting commercial shipping, first in the Channel and then in the Mediterranean.

Parker became commanding officer of the fifth-rate HMS Woolwich in 1757 and then transferred to the fourth-rate HMS Bristol in January 1759. In HMS Bristol he took part in the Invasion of Guadeloupe in May 1759 during the Seven Years' War. He was given command of the third-rate HMS Buckingham in 1760 and took part in the capture of Belle Île in Spring 1761. He transferred to the command of the third-rate HMS Terrible in 1762 and then retired from active service in 1763 at the end of the War.

== American War of Independence ==
Parker's squadron bombarding Fort Sullivan during the Battle of Sullivan's Island

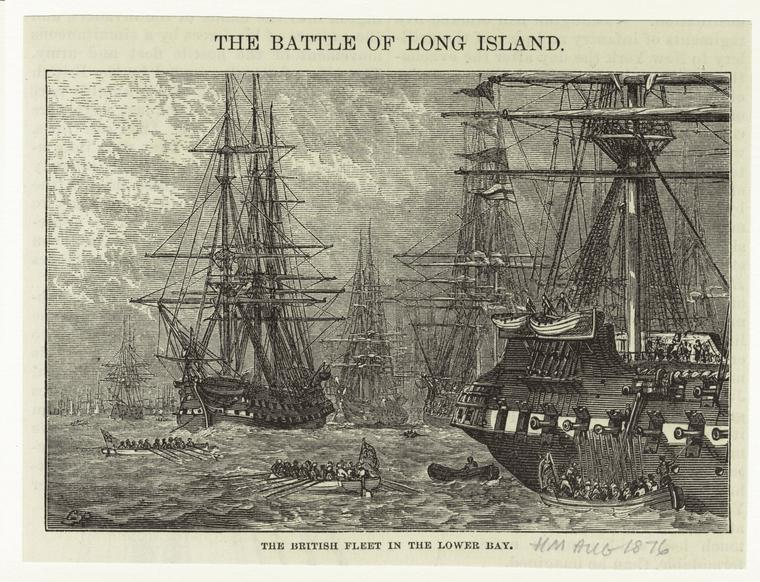
Parker commanded the squadron that captured Long Island

Knighted in 1772, Parker was given command of the second-rate HMS Barfleur when he rejoined the service in 1773. Promoted to commodore, he was deployed to the North American Station, with his broad pennant in the fourth-rate HMS Bristol, in October 1775 to provide naval support for an expedition led by General Sir Henry Clinton reinforcing loyalists in the Southern Colonies at an early stage of the American Revolutionary War.

In June 1776, Parker led a naval attack against the fortifications on Sullivan's Island (later called Fort Moultrie after their commander), protecting Charleston, South Carolina. At the fort, the American Colonel William Moultrie ordered his men to concentrate their fire on the two large man-of-war ships, HMS Bristol and HMS Experiment, which took hit after hit from the fort's guns. Chain-shot fired at HMS Bristol eventually destroyed much of her rigging and severely damaged both the main- and mizzenmasts. After a long and hard-fought battle, Parker was forced to call off the attack, having sustained heavy casualties, including the loss of the sixth-rate HMS Actaeon, grounded and abandoned. Lord William Campbell, the last British Governor of the Province of South Carolina, was mortally wounded aboard HMS Bristol. Parker was himself wounded by a flying splinter which injured his leg and tore off his breeches, an incident that occasioned much mirth in the newspapers.

Parker subsequently served under Lord Howe in the invasion and capture of New York City and, with his broad pennant in the fourth-rate HMS Chatham, he commanded the squadron that captured Long Island in August 1776 and Rhode Island in December 1776.

== Senior command ==
Promoted to rear admiral on 20 May 1777, Parker became Commander-in-Chief, Jamaica Station, with his flag in HMS Bristol, in December 1777. At this time, Parker acted as a patron and friend of Horatio Nelson, then serving aboard the Bristol, an attachment which would endure for the remainder of Nelson's life. Promoted to vice admiral on 29 March 1779, he returned to England in the second-rate HMS Sandwich, accompanied by various prisoners including Admiral De Grasse captured at the Battle of the Saintes, in August 1782.

In 1781, Parker was listed in a freemasonic register as the Provincial Grand Master of the Jamaica Region. Created a baronet on 28 December 1782, Parker was, unwillingly, returned as Member of Parliament for Seaford in May 1784, and then as member for Maldon in 1786. Promoted to full admiral on 24 September 1787, he became Commander-in-Chief, Portsmouth in 1793. He was promoted to Admiral of the Fleet on 16 September 1799 and was Chief Mourner at Nelson's state funeral in January 1806. He died at his home at Weymouth Street in London on 21 December 1811 and was buried at St Margaret's, Westminster. Parker also owned the Manor of Bassingbourne at Takeley in Essex: in accordance with his wishes the manor was demolished in 1813.

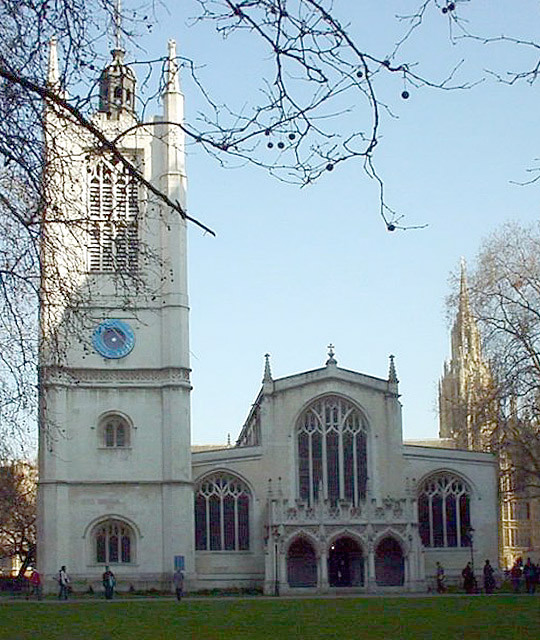
St Margaret's, Westminster where Parker was buried

== Family ==
In around 1761 Parker married Margaret Nugent; they had several children (including Vice-Admiral Christopher Parker). He was succeeded in the baronetcy by Christopher's son Peter Parker.

== Notes ==
Parliament of Great Britain
Preceded by Christopher D'Oyly and John Durand	Member of Parliament for Seaford; 1784–1786; With: Henry Nevill to 1785; Sir John Henderson, Bt from 1785	Succeeded by Sir Godfrey Webster and Henry Flood
Preceded by The Lord Waltham; John Strutt	Member of Parliament for Maldon; 1787–1790; With: John Strutt	Succeeded by Charles Western; Joseph Holden Strutt
Military offices
Preceded by Clark Gayton	Commander-in-Chief, Jamaica Station; 1778–1782	Succeeded by Joshua Rowley
Preceded by Viscount Hood	Commander-in-Chief, Portsmouth; 1793–1799	Succeeded by Mark Milbanke
Preceded by Earl Howe	Admiral of the Fleet; 1799–1811	Succeeded by The Duke of Clarence and St Andrews
Baronetage of Great Britain
New creation	Baronet (of Bassingbourne, Essex); 1783–1811	Succeeded by Peter Parker
