= List of shipwrecks in 1757 =

This is a list of shipwrecks in 1757. It includes ships sunk, wrecked or otherwise lost during 1757.

table of contents
1757
Jan	Feb	Mar	Apr
May	Jun	Jul	Aug
Sep	Oct	Nov	Dec

== January ==
=== 12 January ===
List of shipwrecks: 12 January 1757
Ship	State	Description
Ann	Great Britain	The ship foundered in the English Channel off St Mawes, Cornwall. She was on a voyage from Exeter, Devon, to Liverpool, Lancashire.

=== 14 January ===
List of shipwrecks: 14 January 1757
Ship	State	Description
Fortune	Great Britain	The ship was driven ashore and wrecked near Dublin, Ireland. She was on a voyage from London to Lancaster, Lancashire.
Hope	Great Britain	The ship was driven ashore near Dublin. She was on a voyage from Great Yarmouth, Norfolk, to Liverpool, Lancashire.
St. Pedro	Spain	The ship was driven ashore near Dublin.
Quarantine	Great Britain	The schooner was driven ashore and wrecked near Dublin.
Volunteer	Great Britain	The ship was driven ashore and wrecked near Dublin. She was on a voyage from Liverpool to Jamaica.
Wilson	Great Britain	The ship was driven ashore and wrecked near Dublin.

=== 21 January ===
List of shipwrecks: 21 January 1757
Ship	State	Description
St. Nepunceña	Spain	The ship was driven ashore on the coast of Normandy, France. She was on a voyage from the Canary Islands to Dunkirk, France.

=== 25 January ===
List of shipwrecks: 25 January 1757
Ship	State	Description
Little Sally	Great Britain	The ship was driven ashore and wrecked at Dungeness, Kent, by a privateer. Her crew were rescued. She was on a voyage from Dartmouth, Devon, to London/

=== Unknown date ===
List of shipwrecks: Unknown date 1757
Ship	State	Description
Annabella	Great Britain	The ship was captured off the coast of Africa by four French Navy ships and was sunk.
Black Prince	Great Britain	The ship was captured off the coast of Africa by four French Navy ships and was sunk.
Camelion	(Kingdom of Great Britain) British America	The ship was captured off the coast of Africa by four French Navy ships and was sunk.
Casada Garden	(Kingdom of Great Britain) British America	The ship was captured off the coast of Africa by four French Navy ships and was sunk.
Charles	Great Britain	The ship was captured by a French privateer and was run onto rocks ne Boulogne, France and wrecked. She was on a voyage from Jamaica to London.
Cunliffe	Great Britain	The ship was driven ashore at Mockbeggar, Cheshire. She was on a voyage from Maryland, British America, to Liverpool, Lancashire.
Elizabeth & Mary	Great Britain	The ship was captured off Africa by four French Navy vessels. She was sunk.
Happy Jennet	Great Britain	The ship was lost off the Isles of Scilly. She was on a voyage from Falmouth, Cornwall, to Naples, Kingdom of Sicily.
Holker	Great Britain	The ship was lost near Whitehaven, Cumberland.
Joseph & Abraham	Great Britain	The ship was driven ashore at Portland, Dorset.
Maiters	Great Britain	The ship was lost near Southwold, Suffolk. She was on a voyage from London to Hull, Yorkshire.
Nancy	Great Britain	The ship was captured off the coast of Africa by four French Navy vessels. She was sunk.
Nicholas	Great Britain	The ship foundered in the Irish Sea off Whitehaven. She was on a voyage from Jamaica to Liverpool.
Nostra Señora de Caridad	Spain	The ship was wrecked on the Goodwin Sands, Kent, Great Britain. She was on a voyage from Gijón to London.
Polly	(Kingdom of Great Britain) British America	The ship was captured off the coast of Africa by four French Navy ships and was sunk.
Porter	Great Britain	The ship was driven ashore on Spurn Island, Yorkshire. She was on a voyage from Great Yarmouth to Hull.
Prince of Orange	Great Britain	The ship was captured off the coast of Africa by four French Navy vessels. She was sunk.
Prince of Wales	Great Britain	The ship was lost near Boulogne. She was on a voyage from London to Lisbon, Portugal.
Sarah	(Kingdom of Great Britain) British America	The snow foundered before 29 January. Her crew were rescued. She was on a voyage from Philadelphia, Pennsylvania, to the Piscataqua River.
Toleration	Sweden	The ship foundered on a voyage from Stockholm to Portsmouth, Hampshire, Great Britain.
Union	(Kingdom of Great Britain) British America	The ship was wrecked at Cape Hatteras, North Carolina. She was on a voyage from Rhode Island to a North Carolina port.
Whitington	Great Britain	The ship was captured off the coast of Africa by four French Navy ships and was sunk.
Young Batchelor	(Kingdom of Great Britain) British America	The ship was captured off the coast of Africa by four French Navy ships and was sunk.

== February ==
=== 6 February ===
List of shipwrecks: 6 February 1757
Ship	State	Description
St Anthony	Great Britain	The ship was driven ashore east of Plymouth, Devon. She was on a voyage from Málaga, Spain, to Guernsey, Channel Islands.
Unnamed privateer	France	The privateer (previously the Royal George ( (Kingdom of Great Britain) Guernsey) was driven ashore east of Plymouth.

=== 8 February ===
List of shipwrecks: 8 February 1757
Ship	State	Description
York	Great Britain	The ship was driven ashore and wrecked 5 nautical miles (9.3 km) west of Hastings, Sussex, by a French privateer. She had been on a voyage from Jamaica to Liverpool, Lancashire, but had been captured previously and taken in to Guernsey, Channel Islands, and was then bound for London.

=== 10 February ===
List of shipwrecks: 10 February 1757
Ship	State	Description
William	Great Britain	The ship was driven ashore and wrecked at Hastings, Sussex, by a French privateer. She was on a voyage from Newfoundland, British America, to London.

=== Unknown date ===
List of shipwrecks: Unknown date 1757
Ship	State	Description
Hope	Great Britain	The ship was lost on the Irish coast. She was on a voyage from Saint Kitts to London.
Lady Strange	Great Britain	The ship was lost on Ely Island, Ireland. Her crew were rescued. She was on a voyage from Barbados to London.
Joseph & Jane	Ireland	The ship was driven ashore and wrecked near Waterford. She was on a voyage from Philadelphia, Pennsylvania, British America, to Dublin.
Littleton	Great Britain	The ship was driven ashore 5 leagues (15 nautical miles (28 km)) west of Boulogne, France. She was on a voyage from North Carolina, British America, to London.
Maria	Great Britain	The ship was captured by a French privateer and driven ashore on the French coast. She was on a voyage from New York, British America, to London.
Neptune	Great Britain	The ship was lost near Londonderry, Ireland with the loss of all hands.
Nostra Señora do Soccero i Alma	Spain	The ship foundered in the Atlantic Ocean off the Berlengas, Portugal. She was on a voyage from Seville to London.
Peggy	Great Britain	The ship was lost east of Plymouth, Devon. She was on a voyage from Drogheda, County Louth, Kingdom of Ireland to London.
Seahorse	Great Britain	The ship was driven ashore on the south coast of the Isle of Wight by a French privateer. She was on a voyage from Plymouth, Devon, to London.
Southampton	Great Britain	The ship foundered in the English Channel off Dartmouth, Devon. Her crew were rescued. She was on a voyage from Cowes, Isle of Wight, to Plymouth.
Speedwell	Ireland	The ship was lost near Wexford. She was on a voyage from Seville, Spain, to Dublin.
Success	Great Britain	The ship was driven ashore in Dundrum Bay. She was on a voyage from Liverpool, Lancashire, to the West Indies.

== March ==
=== 13 March ===
List of shipwrecks: 13 March 1757
Ship	State	Description
Betty	Great Britain	The ship foundered in the English Channel off Beachy Head, Sussex. Her crew were rescued by HMS Scorpion ( (Kingdom of Great Britain) Royal Navy).

=== 16 March ===
List of shipwrecks: 16 March 1757
Ship	State	Description
Constance	France	The privateer was wrecked at San Sebastián, Spain.
Princess	Ireland	The ship was driven ashore and wrecked at Gibraltar.

=== 23 March ===
List of shipwrecks: 23 March 1757
Ship	State	Description
Lark	Ireland	The ship was driven ashore near "Stewth". She was on a voyage from Philadelphia, Pennsylvania, British America, to Dublin.

=== 24 March ===
List of shipwrecks: 24 March 1757
Ship	State	Description
Sarah	Great Britain	The ship was driven ashore in Sligo Bay, Ireland, and severely damaged. She was on a voyage from Liverpool, Lancashire, to the Cape Verde Islands.

=== 27 March ===
List of shipwrecks: 27 March 1757
Ship	State	Description
St Antonio	Spain	The ship foundered off Douglas, Isle of Man. She was on a voyage from Málaga to Dublin, Ireland.

=== 28 March ===
List of shipwrecks: 28 March 1757
Ship	State	Description
Black Prince	Great Britain	The ship was destroyed off Anguilla by two French Navy ships.
King George	Great Britain	The ship was destroyed off Anguilla by two French Navy ships.
Ogden	Great Britain	The ship was destroyed off Anguilla by two French Navy ships.
Penelope	Great Britain	The ship was destroyed off Anguilla by two French Navy ships.
True Blue	Great Britain	The ship was destroyed off Anguilla by two French Navy ships.

=== Unknown date ===
List of shipwrecks: Unknown date 1757
Ship	State	Description
Barnwell	Great Britain	The ship was driven ashore at Liverpool, Lancashire.
Bosville	Great Britain	The ship was lost in the Orkney Islands. She was on a voyage from Hull, Yorkshire, to Virginia, British America.
Chichester	Great Britain	The ship capsized at Beaumaris, Anglesey. She was on a voyage from Chichester, Sussex, to Liverpool.
Drogheda Merchant	Ireland	The ship was driven ashore at Liverpool.
Duke	Ireland	The ship sank at Liverpool.
Duke of Cumberland	Great Britain	The ship was driven ashore at Greenock, Renfrewshire.
Eagle	Great Britain	The privateer was in collision with a Dutch ship and foundered.
Earl of Halifax	Great Britain	The ship foundered in the King Road. Her crew were rescued. She was on a voyage from Bristol, Gloucestershire, to London.
Enterprize	Great Britain	The ship was lost near Margate, Kent. She was on a voyage from Guernsey, Channel Islands, to London
Everton	Great Britain	The ship was driven ashore at Liverpool.
Fortune	Great Britain	The ship was driven ashore near Margate. She was on a voyage from London to Lancaster, Lancashire.
Fanny	Great Britain	The ship was driven ashore at Greenock and was severely damaged.
Great Britain	Great Britain	The ship was driven ashore at Liverpool.
Hopewell	Great Britain	The ship was driven ashore at Liverpool. She was on a voyage from Liverpool to an African port.
John	Great Britain	The ship was driven ashore at Liverpool.
John	Great Britain	The ship was driven ashore in the King Road. She was on a voyage from Bristol, Gloucestershire, to Antigua.
Kilham	Great Britain	The ship was driven ashore and wrecked at Saltfleet, Lincolnshire. She was on a voyage from Hull to Porto, Portugal.
Liberty	Great Britain	The ship foundered in the North Sea off Great Yarmouth, Norfolk, with the loss of all hands. She was on a voyage from Dunbar, Lothian, to London.
Manchester	Great Britain	The ship was driven ashore at Liverpool. She was on a voyage from Liverpool to Londonderry, Ireland.
Mercury	Great Britain	The ship foundered. She was on a voyage from Naples, Kingdom of Sicily, to Venice.
Monmoth	Great Britain	The ship was driven ashore at Liverpool. She was on a voyage from Liverpool to Virginia, British America.
Nostra Señora de Rosario	Spain	The ship foundered.
Olive Branch	Great Britain	The ship was driven ashore at Newry, County Antrim, Ireland.
Quester	Great Britain	The ship was driven ashore at Liverpool. She was on a voyage from Liverpool to an African port.
Sandwich	Great Britain	The ship was driven ashore and wrecked at Sandwich, Kent.
Traffords	Great Britain	The ship was driven ashore at Liverpool. She was on a voyage from Liverpool to Philadelphia, Pennsylvania, British America.
Triton	(Denmark) Norway	The ship was driven ashore and wrecked at Pilau, Kingdom of Prussia with the loss of all hands. She was on a voyage from Christiansand to Danzig.
Two Sisters	Great Britain	The ship was driven ashore at Crosby Point, Lancashire. She was on a voyage from Barbados to Liverpool, Lancashire.

== April ==
=== 22 April ===
List of shipwrecks: 22 April 1757
Ship	State	Description
Buchanan	Great Britain	The ship was wrecked on Sable Island. She had been on a voyage from Gibraltar to Maryland, British America, by had been captured by a French privateer and was being sent in to Louisbourg, Nova Scotia.

=== Unknown date ===
List of shipwrecks: Unknown date 1757
Ship	State	Description
Africa	Great Britain	The ship foundered in Carlisle Bay. She was on a voyage from Liverpool, Lancashire, to an African port.
Betsey	Great Britain	The ship was captured by four French Navy ships and was burnt. She was on a voyage from Denia, Spain, to Bristol, Gloucestershire.
Craven	Great Britain	The ship was lost at St. Mary's, Isles of Scilly. She was on a voyage from Jamaica to London.
Elizabeth	Great Britain	The ship was captured by four French Navy ships and was burnt. She was on a voyage from Zant, Karli-Eli to London.
Exchange	Great Britain	The ship was lost near Edinburgh, Lothian. She was on a voyage from Hull, Yorkshire, to Königsberg, Prussia.
Fanny	Great Britain	The ship foundered in the Studdal Roads, off the Welsh coast. She was on a voyage from Jamaica to Liverpool.
Hawke	Great Britain	The ship was lost off Texel, Dutch Republic. She was on a voyage from Boston, Lincolnshire, to Amsterdam.
Industry	Great Britain	The ship capsized in the Catwater.
Macclesfield	Great Britain	The ship was lost "below the Cole". She was on a voyage from Hull to Riga, Russia.
Robert and Anne	Great Britain	The ship foundered whilst on a voyage from Lisbon, Portugal, to Dover, Kent.
Sarah	Great Britain	The ship was lost near Portsoy, Aberdeenshire.
Southampton Sally	Great Britain	The ship was driven ashore near Chester, Cheshire. She was on a voyage from Southampton, Hampshire, to Chester.
St. Lucar	Spain	The ship was driven ashore and wrecked at Plymouth, Devon.

== May ==
=== 14 May ===
List of shipwrecks: 14 May 1757
Ship	State	Description
Aquilon	French Navy	The 48-gun fifth rate was driven ashore and wrecked in Audierne Bay by HMS Antelope ( (Kingdom of Great Britain) Royal Navy).

=== Unknown date ===
List of shipwrecks: Unknown date 1757
Ship	State	Description
Hope	Great Britain	The ship was wrecked on a rock in the Firth of Forth. She was on a voyage from Rotterdam, Dutch Republic, to an Irish port.
Hope	Great Britain	The ship foundered off the "Anot Islands". She was on a voyage from Bergen, Norway, to Riga, Russia.
Postillion	France	The privateer was captured by HMS Rochester ( (Kingdom of Great Britain) Royal Navy) and was burnt.
Royal Widow	Great Britain	The ship foundered whilst on a voyage from Bristol, Gloucestershire, to Lisbon, Portugal. Her crew were rescued by the privateer Defiance (Great Britain).

== June ==
=== 10 June ===
List of shipwrecks: 10 June 1757
Ship	State	Description
Granville	France	The privateer exploded off the Isles of Scilly, Great Britain, during an engagement with the privateer Britannia (Great Britain. Four survivors of her 280 crew were rescued by Britannia.

=== Unknown date ===
List of shipwrecks: Unknown date 1757
Ship	State	Description
Junon	French Navy	The frigate ran aground at Mahón, Menorca. She was declared a total loss and broken up.
Matilda	Great Britain	The ship ran aground in the River Suir at Waterford, Ireland, and was wrecked. She was on a voyage from Bristol, Gloucestershire, to Waterford.
Nostra Señora de la Mayor	Spain	The ship was lost on the Portuguese coast. She was on a voyage from Seville to Bristol.
Royal George	Great Britain	The ship ran aground off Chichester, Sussex. She was on a voyage from London to Guinea.

== July ==
=== 2 July ===
List of shipwrecks: 2 July 1757
Ship	State	Description
Rose	French Navy	The fifth rate was engaged off Malta by HMS Hampton Court ( (Kingdom of Great Britain) Royal Navy). She was scuttled to avoid capture by HMS Monmouth and HMS Lyme (both (Kingdom of Great Britain) Royal Navy)

=== 27 July ===
List of shipwrecks: 27 July 1757
Ship	State	Description
Elizabeth	Great Britain	The ship was wrecked on the Seven Stones Reef. She was on a voyage from Porto, Portugal, to Hull, Yorkshire.

=== Unknown date ===
List of shipwrecks: Unknown date 1757
Ship	State	Description
Duke of Bedford	Ireland	The privateer was driven ashore and wrecked at Dublin. Her crew were rescued.

== August ==
=== 12 August ===
List of shipwrecks: 12 August 1757
Ship	State	Description
Clinton	Great Britain	The ship was wrecked on the No Mans Land sandbar, South Carolina, British America.

=== Unknown date ===
List of shipwrecks: Unknown date 1757
Ship	State	Description
Barbadoes	Great Britain	The ship capsized and sank in the River Dee, Cheshire. She was on a voyage from London to Chester, Cheshire.
Dragon	Great Britain	The ship foundered in the English Channel off Plymouth, Devon, with the loss of seven of her crew. She was on a voyage from Jamaica to London.
Elizabeth	Great Britain	The ship was wrecked on The Nore, in the Thames Estuary.
La Muette	France	The ship was driven ashore and wrecked at Dale, Pembrokeshire, Great Britain.
Pretty Peggy	Ireland	The ship was lost off Liverpool, Lancashire, Great Britain. She was on a voyage from Sligo to Philadelphia, Pennsylvania, British America via Liverpool.
Providence	Great Britain	The ship was driven ashore on Öland, Sweden. She was on a voyage from Stockholm, Sweden, to London.
Prince George	Great Britain	The ship was wrecked at Blackwall, London. She was on a voyage from Jamaica to London.
Rhode-Island	Great Britain	The ship was wrecked on the East Knock, in the North Sea. She was on a voyage from Jamaica to London.
Robert	Ireland	The ship foundered whilst on a voyage from Seville, Spain, to Dublin. Her crew were rescued.
Swift	Great Britain	The ship was wrecked on The Nore.
Two Brothers	Great Britain	The ship sank at Plymouth, Devon following her arrival from Porto, Portugal.
Venyowa	Great Britain	The ship was driven ashore and wrecked at Ramsgate, Kent. She was on a voyage from London to North Carolina, British America.

== September ==
=== 9 September ===
List of shipwrecks: 9 September 1757
Ship	State	Description
Marie	Great Britain	The collier was wrecked on Lundy Island, Devon, with the loss of all hands.

=== 11 September ===
List of shipwrecks: 11 September 1757
Ship	State	Description
Minie	Great Britain	The ship capsized in the Atlantic Ocean. Her crew were rescued by Chipenham (Great Britain). She was on a voyage from Maryland, British America, to Glasgow, Renfrewshire.

=== 16 September ===
List of shipwrecks: 16 September 1757
Ship	State	Description
Yungfrau Anna-Yekaterina (Юнгфрау Анна-Екатерина, 'Jungfrau Anna Katherina')	Imperial Russian Navy	The yacht sank near the village of Mustalo. Her crew were rescued. She was on a voyage from Reval to Kronstadt.

=== 21 September ===
List of shipwrecks: 21 September 1757
Ship	State	Description
Dorothea	Russia	The ship was lost near Calais, Kingdom of France. She was on a voyage from Saint Petersburg to Livorno, Grand Duchy of Tuscany.

=== 22 September ===
List of shipwrecks: 22 September 1757
Ship	State	Description
Nancy	Great Britain	The ship foundered in the Atlantic Ocean (48°16′N 17°57′W). Her crew were rescued by True Patriot. She was on a voyage from Glasgow, Renfrewshire, to Boston, Massachusetts, British America.

=== 24 September ===
List of shipwrecks: 24 September 1757
Ship	State	Description
HMS Ferret	(Kingdom of Great Britain) Royal Navy	The sloop-of-war foundered in a hurricane off the coast of New France with the loss of all 125 crew.
HMS Tilbury	(Kingdom of Great Britain) Royal Navy	Louisbourg Expedition: The fourth rate ship of the line was wrecked off Louisbourg, Île-Royale, New France with the loss of 121 of her crew.

=== Unknown date ===
List of shipwrecks: Unknown date in September 1757
Ship	State	Description
Duke of Cumberland	Great Britain	The ship, operating under a letter of marque, foundered in the Atlantic Ocean 9 leagues (27 nautical miles (50 km) south of Cape Henry, Virginia, British America, with the loss of 25 of her 46 crew.
English Oak	Great Britain	The ship capsized at Dublin, Ireland, and was wrecked.
Margaret	Great Britain	The ship was captured and burnt by a French privateer. She was on a voyage from the Firth of Forth to Gothenburg, Sweden.
Mary & Elizabeth	Great Britain	The ship foundered in the Bristol Channel. She was on a voyage from Stockholm, Sweden, to Liverpool, Lancashire.
Merry Katherine	Great Britain	The ship was lost off Dunkirk, France. She had been ov a voyage from New York, British America, to Amsterdam, Dutch Republic, but had been captured by a French privateer and sent in to that port.

== October ==
=== 6 October ===
List of shipwrecks: 6 October 1757
Ship	State	Description
Gogland (Гогланд)	Imperial Russian Navy	The ship ran aground at Memel, Prussia while being piloted and was wrecked. Her crew were rescued.

=== 9 October ===
List of shipwrecks: 9 October 1757
Ship	State	Description
Vakhmeyster (Вахмейстер, 'Wachtmeister')	Imperial Russian Navy	The Gektor-class frigate was driven ashore on the island of Aegna and sank with the loss of fourteen of her crew. She was on a voyage from Reval to Kronstadt.

=== 10 October ===
List of shipwrecks: 10 October 1757
Ship	State	Description
Griffin	Great Britain	The ship was driven ashore at Abbotsbury, Dorset, with the los of nine lives. She was on a voyage from Gibraltar to London.

=== 17 October ===
List of shipwrecks: 17 October 1757
Ship	State	Description
Olifant (Олифант, 'Elefant')	Imperial Russian Navy	The ship was driven ashore by ice near the ru:Tolbukhin Lighthouse. She was refloated the following spring and taken in to Kronstadt.

=== 18 October ===
List of shipwrecks: 18 October 1757
Ship	State	Description
Friendship	Great Britain	The ship was lost on the Holms Head Sand, in the North Sea off Lowestoft, Suffolk.

=== 25 October ===
List of shipwrecks: 25 October 1757
Ship	State	Description
Swift	Great Britain	The ship sailed from Jamaica for Bristol, Gloucestershire. No further trace, presumed foundered.

=== 28 October ===
List of shipwrecks: 28 October 1757
Ship	State	Description
John & Jane	Great Britain	The ship was driven ashore at Narva, Russia.

=== Unknown date ===
List of shipwrecks: Unknown date 1757
Ship	State	Description
Edward	Ireland	The ship was driven ashore at Douglas, Isle of Man.
Hampton Court	Great Britain	The ship foundered whilst on a voyage from Stockholm, Sweden, to King's Lynn, Norfolk. Her crew were rescued.
Lyme	Great Britain	The privateer capsized in Weymouth Bay with the loss of all but two of her crew. The survivors were rescued by the privateer Cumberland ( (Kingdom of Great Britain) Guernsey.

== November ==
=== 3 November ===
List of shipwrecks: 3 November 1757
Ship	State	Description
Hawke	Great Britain	The ship was wrecked on the "Collerados". She was on a voyage from Jamaica to London.

=== 6 November ===
List of shipwrecks: 6 November 1757
Ship	State	Description
Industry	Great Britain	The ship ran aground off Guernsey, Channel Islands.

=== 8 November ===
List of shipwrecks: 8 November 1757
Ship	State	Description
Nympha do Lomar	Spain	The ship was driven ashore and severely damaged at San Lucar. She was on a voyage from Málaga to London, Great Britain.

=== 11 November ===
List of shipwrecks: 11 November 1757
Ship	State	Description
Bellona	Great Britain	The privateer capsized in the River Avon at Bristol, Gloucestershire, and was wrecked.

=== 29 November ===
List of shipwrecks: 29 November 1757
Ship	State	Description
Nossa Senhora da Caridade e São José	Portugal	The ship was wrecked on the French coast. Her crew were rescued. She was on a voyage from Faro to London, Great Britain.

=== 30 November ===
List of shipwrecks: 30 November 1757
Ship	State	Description
Elizabeth and Janet	Great Britain	The ship was captured by a French privateer. She was then pursued by an English privateer but was deliberately run ashore and wrecked. She was on a voyage from Leith, Lothian, to San Lucar, Spain.

=== Unknown date ===
List of shipwrecks: Unknown date 1757
Ship	State	Description
Charles	Great Britain	The ship was driven ashore and wrecked in Barnstaple Bay. She was on a voyage from Bristol to Cork, Ireland.
Fly	Great Britain	The ship foundered in the Atlantic Ocean off St. Ives, Cornwall, with the loss of four lives. She was on a voyage from Boston to Bristol, Gloucestershire.
Friendship	Great Britain	The ship was driven ashore and wrecked on Gigha.
Heroine	France	The privateer, a prize of the Duke of Cornwall (Great Britain), capsized at Weymouth, Dorset, with the loss of 42 lives.
Orford	Great Britain	The ship was driven ashore and wrecked at "the Neals". She was on a voyage from Maryland, British America, to Liverpool, Lancashire.
Prins Frederick	(Denmark) Norway	The ship foundered off Drontheim. She was on a voyage from Dublin to Drontheim.
Recovery	Great Britain	The privateer foundered in the Bristol Channel with the loss of 74 lives.
Swallow	Great Britain	The ship was lost near Beaumaris, Anglesey. She was on a voyage from Jamaica to Liverpool.

== December ==
=== 3 December ===
List of shipwrecks: 3 December 1757
Ship	State	Description
Redheasell	Great Britain	The ship foundered in the Atlantic Ocean. She was on a voyage from Gibraltar to Jamaica via Madeira. Her crew were rescued.

=== 4 December ===
List of shipwrecks: 4 December 1757
Ship	State	Description
Neptune	Great Britain	The brig was wrecked at Dover, Kent, whilst trying to evade a French privateer. She was on a voyage from Bristol, Gloucestershire, to Hamburg.

=== 19 December ===
List of shipwrecks: 19 December 1757
Ship	State	Description
Diamond	France	The ship was intercepted by HMS Brilliant ( (Kingdom of Great Britain) Royal Navy) in the Atlantic Ocean. She exploded and sank. Twenty-four survivors were rescued by HMS Brilliant.
Intrepide	Great Britain	The privateer was sunk in the Atlantic Ocean by HMS Brilliant ( (Kingdom of Great Britain) Royal Navy), which rescued her 130 crew.

=== 20 December ===
List of shipwrecks: 20 December 1757
Ship	State	Description
Nostra Señora de Rosaria, Santa Anna, Santa Antonio et Santa Almas	Spain	The ship was driven ashore and wrecked near Sandown Castle, Kent, Great Britain.

=== 24 December ===
List of shipwrecks: 24 December 1757
Ship	State	Description
Thomas and Elizabeth	Great Britain	The ship was driven ashore and wrecked at Plymouth Hoe, Devon.

=== Unknown date ===
List of shipwrecks: Unknown date 1757
Ship	State	Description
Ann & Isabel	Spain	The ship was wrecked near Waterford, Ireland.
Aquila Imperial	Spain	The ship was lost near St Andero with the loss of twenty of her crew. She was on a voyage from London, Great Britain, to Bilbao.
Benjamin	Great Britain	The ship foundered in the North Sea off Great Yarmouth, Norfolk.
Betty	Ireland	The ship was wrecked on the Norwegian coast. She was on a voyage from Gothenburg, Sweden, to Londonderry.
Charlotta Frederika	Denmark	The ship foundered in the North Sea off Great Yarmouth.
Charm	Great Britain	The ship was lost on the Norwegian coast. She was on a voyage from Gothenburg to Dundee, Perthshire.
Charming Peggy	Great Britain	The ship foundered in the North Sea off Great Yarmouth.
Clifford	Great Britain	The ship foundered in the North Sea off Great Yarmouth.
Dirk William & Cornelia	Dutch Republic	The ship foundered in the North Sea off Great Yarmouth.
Elizabeth	Great Britain	The ship foundered in the Atlantic Ocean off the coast of Portugal. She was on a voyage from London to Nova Scotia, British North America.
Exchange	Great Britain	The ship foundered in the North Sea off Great Yarmouth.
Freeden	(Denmark) Norway	The ship foundered in the Norwegian Sea off Bergen. She was on a voyage from London to Drontheim.
Friends Goodwill	Great Britain	The ship was wrecked on the East Barrowheads Sand, in the North Sea, with the loss of four of her ten crew. She was on a voyage from Newcastle upon Tyne, Northumberland, to London.
Friends Goodwill	Great Britain	The ship foundered in the North Sea off Great Yarmouth.
Friendship	Great Britain	The ship foundered in the North Sea off Great Yarmouth.
Happy Janet	Great Britain	The ship was driven ashore and wrecked on Skagen, Denmark. She was on a voyage from Gothenburg to the Firth of Forth.
Henrietta	Great Britain	The ship was driven ashore in the Sound of Islay. She was on a voyage from Virginia, British America, to Glasgow, Renfrewshire.
Hope	Great Britain	The ship foundered in the North Sea off Corton, Suffolk, with the loss of all hands.
Italian Merchant	Great Britain	The ship foundered in the North Sea off Great Yarmouth.
Jennet & Margaret	Great Britain	The ship foundered in the North Sea off Great Yarmouth.
John	Great Britain	The ship foundered in the North Sea off Great Yarmouth.
John & Margaret	Great Britain	The ship was lost near San Lucar, Spain. She was on a voyage from Newcastle upon Tyne to Gibraltar.
Laurel	Great Britain	The privateer was captured and sunk by Saint Michel (French Navy).
Leviathan	Great Britain	The ship foundered in the North Sea off Great Yarmouth.
Lintott	Great Britain	The ship was driven ashore and wrecked at Crosby, Lancashire.
Maria	Great Britain	The ship was wrecked near Wells-next-the-Sea, Norfolk. She was on a voyage from Rotterdam, Dutch Republic, to Stockton on Tees, County Durham.
Masters	Great Britain	The ship foundered in the North Sea off Great Yarmouth.
Nepthanis	Dutch Republic	The ship foundered in the North Sea off Great Yarmouth.
Nostra Señora de Rosario Santa Anna Santa Antonio & Aluas	Spain	The ship was driven ashore and wrecked at Sandown Castle, Kent, Great Britain. She was on a voyage from London to Terceira.
Otter	Great Britain	The ship foundered in the North Sea off Great Yarmouth.
Port Merchant	Great Britain	The ship foundered in the North Sea off Great Yarmouth.
Providence	Great Britain	The ship foundered in the North Sea off Great Yarmouth.
Restoration	Great Britain	The ship foundered in the North Sea off Great Yarmouth.
Seanymph	Great Britain	The ship foundered in the North Sea off Great Yarmouth.
Spaandershort	Dutch East India CompanyGreat Britain	The East Indiaman was destroyed by fire off Texel, Dutch Republic.
Spalden Packet	Great Britain	The ship foundered in the North Sea off Great Yarmouth.
St. George	Great Britain	The ship was wrecked at Tynemouth, Northumberland. She was on a voyage from Newfoundland, British America, to Tynemouth.
St. Peter	Great Britain	The ship foundered in the North Channel with the loss of all but two of her crew. She was on a voyage from Boston, Massachusetts, British America, to Bristol, Gloucestershire.
Success	Ireland	The ship was driven ashore at Dublin.
Unicorn	Great Britain	The ship was driven ashore and wrecked on Gotland, Sweden. She was on a voyage from Saint Petersburg, Russia, to Hull, Yorkshire.
Union	Great Britain	The ship foundered in the North Sea off Great Yarmouth.
Virchild	Great Britain	The ship was wrecked on the Goodwin Sands, Kent, with the loss of all hands. She was on a voyage from Great Yarmouth, Norfolk, to Trieste, Archduchy of Austria.
Walpole	Great Britain	The ship was wrecked on The Staples, in the North Sea 30 nautical miles (56 km) off Tynemouth. Her crew were rescued. She was on a voyage from London to Newcastle upon Tyne, Northumberland.
Wilson	Great Britain	The ship foundered in the North Sea. She was on a voyage from Stockholm, Sweden, to Plymouth, Devon.
Young Alexander	Ireland	The ship was driven ashore at Arklow, County Wicklow.
Young Batchelor	Great Britain	The ship was wrecked on the Irish coast. She was on a voyage from Newfoundland to Bristol.

== Unknown date ==
List of shipwrecks: Unknown date 1757
Ship	State	Description
Anamaboo	Great Britain	The ship was lost off the coast of Carolina, British America. Her crew were rescued. She was on a voyage from an African port to Rhode Island, British America.
Anne & Elizabeth	Great Britain	The ship was captured by three French Navy frigates off Louisbourg, Île Royale, French North America and was burnt.
Arch Duke of Austria	Archduchy of Austria	The ship was driven ashore and wrecked on "the coast of Italy".
Beckford	Great Britain	The ship foundered whilst on a voyage from Nevis to London. Her crew were rescued.
Cæsar	Great Britain	The ship was wrecked on the Jordans, off the coast of Cuba. Her crew were rescued. She was on a voyage from Jamaica to London.
Centurion	Ireland	The ship was captured by a French ship. She was on a voyage from Killibeg, County Donegal, to Livorno, Grand Duchy of Tuscany. She was sent in to Marseille was lost off that port.
Charming Jenny	Great Britain	The ship foundered whilst on a voyage from Venice to Jamaica. Her crew were rescued by HMS Assistance ( (Kingdom of Great Britain) Royal Navy).
Cornelia	Great Britain	The ship foundered in the Atlantic Ocean off the Delaware Capes, British America, with the loss of three of her crew. She was on a voyage from Philadelphia, Pennsylvania, British America, to Gibraltar.
Count Axel Fersen	Sweden	The ship was wrecked on the Moorish coast with the loss of about half of her crew. The survivors were taken prisoner. She was on a voyage from London to Barcelona, Spain.
Don Pedro	Dutch Republic	The ship was lost near Barbuda. She was on a voyage from Amsterdam to Sint Eustatius.
Duke	Great Britain	The ship foundered in the Atlantic Ocean. Her crew were rescued. She was on a voyage from Virginia to London.
Elizabeth	Great Britain	The ship was lost whilst on a voyage from Philadelphia to Montserrat.
Figuera Packet	Great Britain	The ship was captured by a French Navy frigate whilst on a voyage from Gibraltar to London. She was plundered and burnt.
George	Great Britain	The ship was lost off the coast of Carolina, British America. She was on a voyage from Georgia, British America to the Leeward Islands.
Lydia	Great Britain	The ship foundered in the Atlantic Ocean. Her crew were rescued. She was on a voyage from Virginia to London.
Martha & Mary	Ireland	The ship foundered in the Atlantic Ocean 40 leagues (120 nautical miles (220 km)) off Jamaica. Her crew were rescued. She was on a voyage from Dublin to Jamaica.
Mary	Great Britain	The ship was lost off the Bahamas. She was on a voyage from Philadelphia, Pennsylvania, to Antigua.
Mediterranean	Great Britain	The transport ship foundered. Her crew were rescued.
Mermaid	Great Britain	The transport ship foundered. Her crew were rescued.
Myrtilla	Great Britain	The ship foundered in the Gulf of Florida. Her crew survived. She was on a voyage from Jamaica to London.
Nouvelle Société	France	The ship was lost in the Saint Lawrence River. She was on a voyage from Bordeaux to Quebeck, French America.
Pearl	Great Britain	The ship was lost at Montserrat.
Peter & Mary	Great Britain	The transport ship foundered. Her crew were rescued.
Pusey	Great Britain	The ship was driven ashore and wrecked on Reedy Island, Delaware, British America.
Richard & Jane	Great Britain	The transport ship foundered. Her crew were rescued.
Sally	Great Britain	The ship was lost in the Delaware River, British America. She was on a voyage from Philadelphia, Pennsylvania, to Jamaica.
Speculation	Sweden	The ship was captured off Livorno by a French ship. She was sent in to Marseille was lost off that port.
Swallow	Great Britain	The ship was wrecked on the coast of Newfoundland, British America, with the loss of several lives. She was on a voyage from Poole, Dorset, to Newfoundland.
Thomas & Mary	Great Britain	The ship foundered whilst on a voyage from Jamaica to London. Her crew were rescued by William & Mary (Great Britain).
Virginia	Great Britain	The ship was lost off North Carolina, British America, before 11 November.
