= Action of 6 July 1746 =

1746 naval battle

Coordinates: 10.7667°N 79.8333°E

Battle of Negapatam (1746)
- Part of War of the Austrian Succession
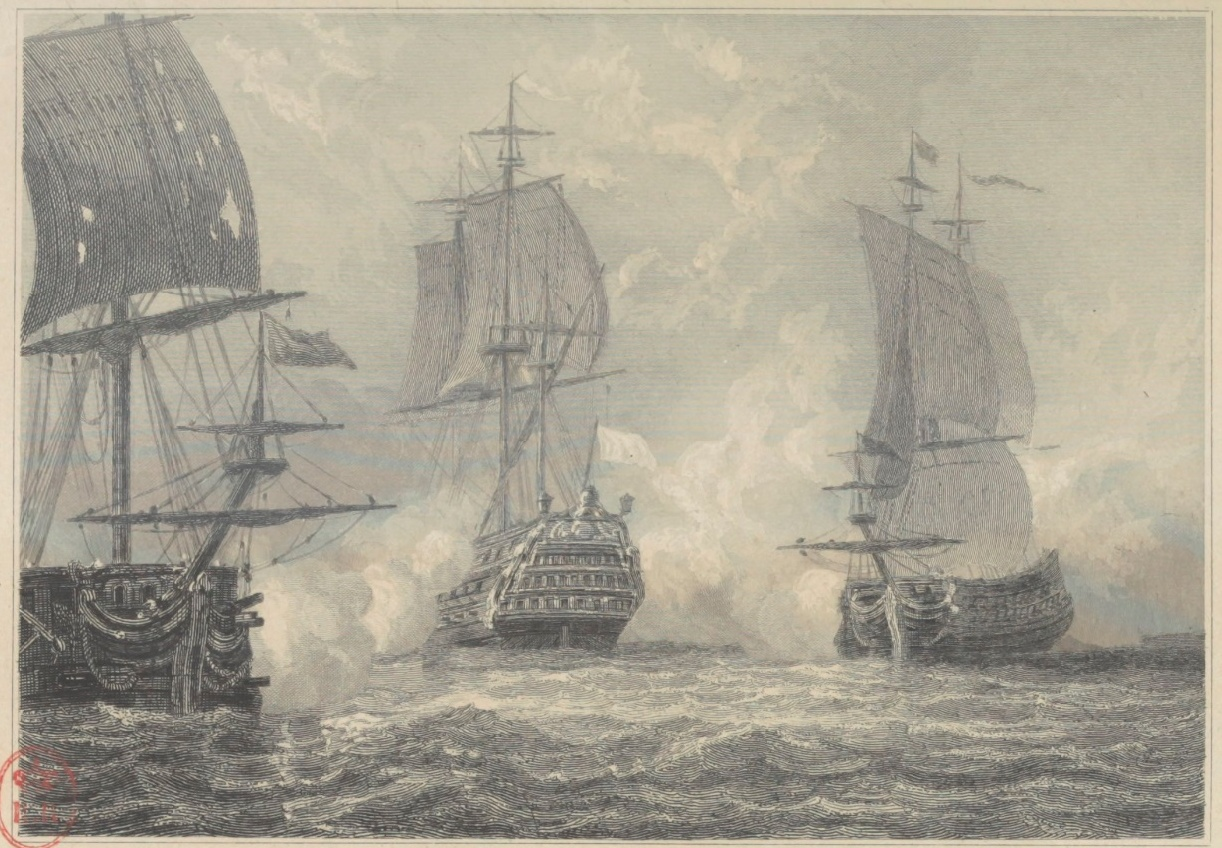
Date	6 July 1746
Location	Coast of Negapatam, Indian Ocean
Result	Inconclusive

Belligerents
Great Britain	France

Commanders and leaders
(Kingdom of Great Britain) Edward Peyton	(Kingdom of France) Bertrand-François Mahé de La Bourdonnais

Strength
4 Ships of the line; 2 Frigates	1 Ship of the line; 8 East Indiamen

Casualties and losses
14 killed; 46 wounded	27 killed; 53 wounded

The action of 6 July 1746 was an inconclusive naval engagement between the British and French fleets during the War of the Austrian Succession.

== Battle ==
The English fleet, first under the command of Commodore Curtis Barnett and then Edward Peyton, and a French fleet under Bertrand-François Mahé de La Bourdonnais, engaged each other early in the First Carnatic War. Both fleets were damaged, with La Bourdonnais putting in at Pondicherry for repairs, and Peyton at Trincomalee. La Bourdonnais acquired additional guns at Pondicherry, and when the fleets met again in August 1746, Peyton refused battle and retreated to Bengal. La Bourdonnais then proceeded to lead the successful French attack on Madras in September.

== Order of Battle ==
=== Royal Navy ===
Ship	Guns	Commander	Ref.
Medway	60	Commodore Edward Peyton; Captain Henry Rosewell	
Preston	50	Captain Lord Northesk	
Winchester	50	Captain Lord Thomas Bertie	
Harwich	50	Captain Philip Carteret	
Medway's Prize	40	Captain Thomas Griffin	
Lively	20	Captain Nathaniel Stephens	

=== France ===
Ship	Guns	Ref.
Achille	60	
Duc d'Orléans	26	
Bourbon	36	
Neptune	34	
Phénix	34	
Saint Louis	30	
Lys	34	
Insulaire	28	
