= Invasion of Martinique (1759) =

- Part of the Seven Years' War
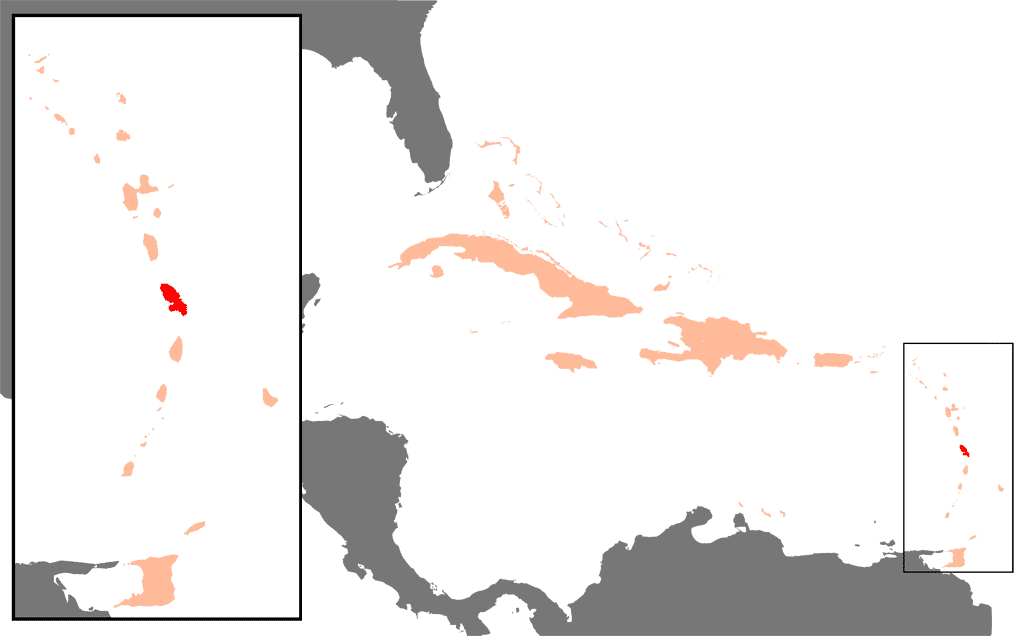
- Position of Martinique in the Caribbean
Date	16–19 January 1759
Location	Martinique, West Indies
Result	French victory

Belligerents
Great Britain	France

Commanders and leaders
Peregrine Hopson; John Barrington; John Moore	François V de Beauharnais

Strength
4,500–5,000 regulars 10 ships of the line 2 frigates	250 regulars 10,000 militia 1 ship of the line 1 frigate

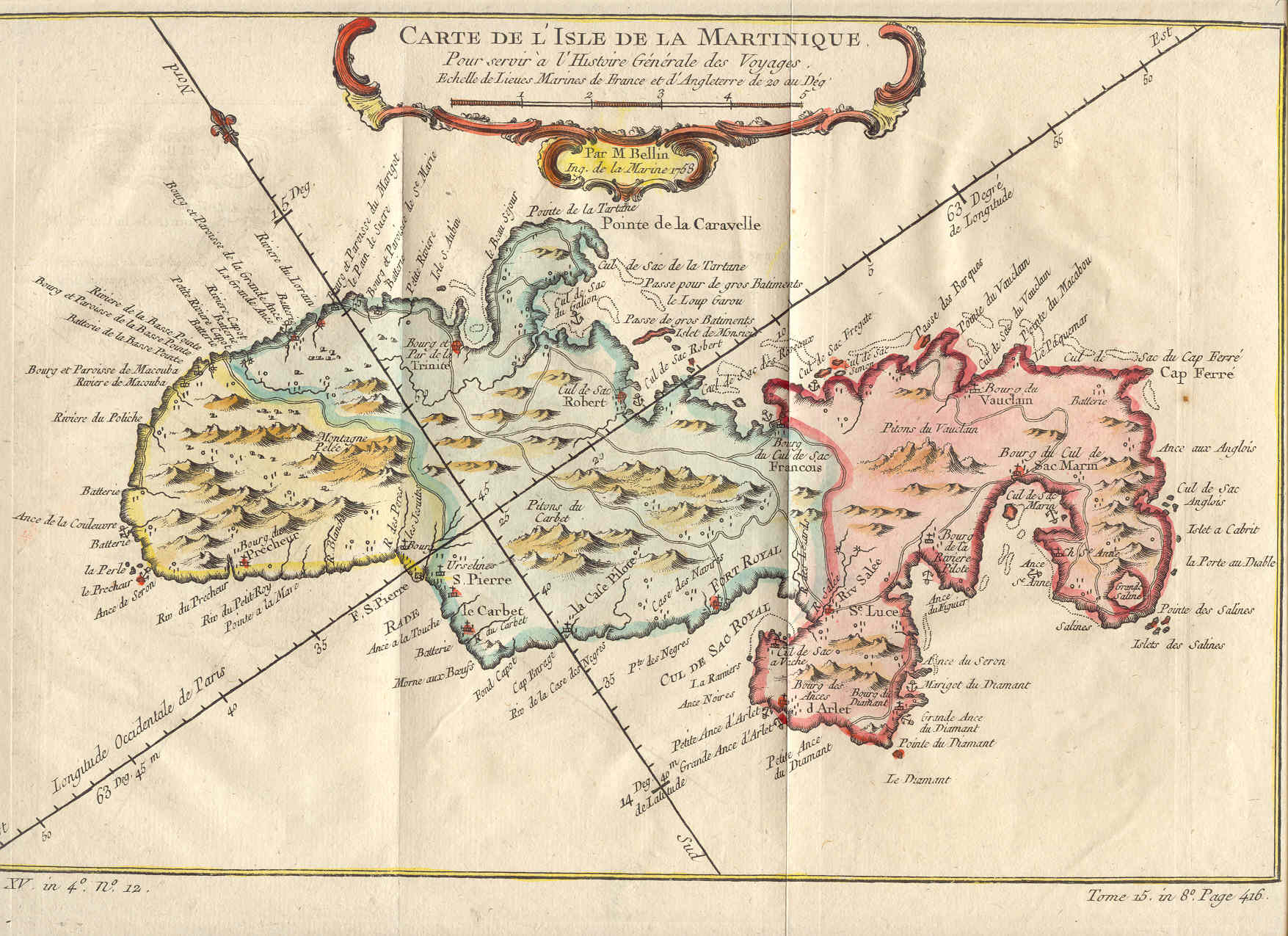
Map of Martinique made in the years before 1759

A British invasion of Martinique took place in January 1759 when a large amphibious force under Peregrine Hopson landed on the French-held island of Martinique and unsuccessfully tried to capture it during the Seven Years' War. Cannon fire from the British fleet was ineffective against the fortress at Fort-Royal due to its location high on the cliffs, and there were no suitable landing places nearby. Unknown to the British commanders, French governor Francis de Beauharnais had not been resupplied for some months, and even a brief siege would have led to the fort's capitulation. However, Moore and Hopson decided instead to investigate the possibility of attacking Martinique's main commercial port, Saint-Pierre. After a desultory naval bombardment on 19 January that again had little effect on the port's defences, they withdrew, and decided instead to attack Guadeloupe, home to a significant body of French privateers. The expedition was successful at Guadeloupe, which surrendered to them in May 1759. In 1762 a British force captured Martinique.

== Background ==
The sugar islands in the Caribbean were of huge economic importance to both Britain and France and their loss would lead to serious financial trouble. French possessions in the Caribbean were thought to be poorly defended and late in 1758, a decision was made to attempt to capture the French-held islands and a force of nearly 5,000 men under Major-General Peregrine Hopson was assembled for this purpose. The bulk of the troops, including 700 marines, left England in transports in November. Eight ships-of-the-line sent to reinforce the Leeward Squadron, under Commodore John Moore, acted as escorts. The convoy arrived in Carlisle Bay on the island of Barbados the following January where it was later joined by a battalion of Royal Highlanders from Scotland, accompanied by the fifth-rate HMS Ludlow Castle of 40 guns. Prior to leaving, Hopson twice had the troops practice debarkation in Carlisle Bay so each understood their position and the order in which they were to land.

== Attack ==
On 13 January, the British set sail for Martinique and arrived two days later. During the afternoon on 15 January, the fleet rounded Diamond Rock and entered Fort-Royal Bay, where it encountered two French warships anchored off Point Negro. These ships, the 74-gun Florissant and the frigate, Bellone immediately set sail and ran across the bay where, at 18:00, they hove to beneath the guns of the citadel. During the night, Bellone managed to sneak out with dispatches. She never reached France however, being captured en route by Admiral Charles Holmes' squadron on its way to Quebec. At 08:00 on 16 January 1759, the two 44-gun ships, HMS Roebuck and HMS Woolwich with the 50-gun HMS Winchester, opened fire on the batteries in Cas des Navieres Bay, where it was intended to land the troops. At the same time, the 50-gun HMS Bristol and the 60-gun HMS Rippon attacked Fort Negro, three miles away. The battery at Cas des Navieres was silenced when the magazine exploded, but the ships continued to direct their fire at the shore to prevent the enemy forming up and opposing a landing. In anticipation of an invasion, French troops had been stationed at many of the island's small bays and constructed earthworks to hinder any landing.

At 14:00, the British assembled three divisions of troops in boats, behind the stern of HMS Cambridge. At 16:00 the ships began a covering fire while the landing parties rowed towards the beach. Most of the troops were landed before nightfall and without encountering much opposition, made the highground above the fort on Point Negro. The British ships, which had been moved closer to the shore, came under heavy fire and were forced to withdraw. It was not until the following morning that the artillery and remaining troops were landed, the French meanwhile, had spent the night fortifying their positions. By 07:00 though, the British had advanced beyond the fort and had begun clearing the woods of enemy troops. Three hours later, they had established a battery on the high ground above the fort and by the afternoon, British soldiers had assembled on the hill overlooking the town. Hopson however did not think it feasible to hold these position without further support from the navy. At 14:00 he sent a request to Moore, asking that either heavy cannon be landed on the shore near the town, or that the ships direct their fire upon the citadel while he simultaneously launched an attack. Moore could not comply with either request because contrary winds and currents prevented the ships getting within range of the town, and the boats landing the cannon would be exposed to an unacceptable level of fire. Moore offered to land the guns at Fort Negro and have his seamen drag them the three miles over rough terrain but following a council of war, it was decided to abandon the attack on Fort Royal and concentrate instead on the island's capital, Saint-Pierre.

The British Fleet left Fort Royal Bay on the evening of 18 January and arrived off Saint-Pierre at 06:00 the next day. At 07:00 HMS Panther took soundings of the bay and at 08:00 the bomb ketches were ordered in to attack the town. At the same time Rippon put a battery 1 1/2 miles to the north out of action, taking heavy fire in the process. The lee-shore wind which had made entrance to the bay so easy, hampered Rippon's withdrawal and boats had to be sent in to tow her out. A further council of war was then held where the cost of capturing and holding the island was discussed. It was calculated that the resources required would be better employed in the taking Guadeloupe which was a haven for privateers preying on British merchant shipping. The troops were therefore subsequently evacuated and the squadron set sail for Guadeloupe on the morning 20 January. The attack began on 23 January but it was May 1759 before the entire island was under British control.

== See also ==
- Great Britain in the Seven Years War
- France in the Seven Years War

== Bibliography ==
- Anderson, Fred. Crucible of War, Faber and Faber, 2000
- Beatson, Robert (1790). Naval and Military Memoirs of Great Britain: From the Year 1727 to the Present Time, Volume II. London: J. Strachan.
- Clowes, William Laird (1996) [1900]. The Royal Navy, A History from the Earliest Times to 1900, Volume III. London: Chatham Publishing. ISBN 1-86176-012-4.
- Dull, Jonathan The French Navy and the Seven Years' War
- Howard, Martin R. (2015). Death Before Glory - The British Soldier in the West Indies in the French Revolutionary and Napoleonic Wars. Barnsley: Pen and Sword Publishing. ISBN 978-1-78159-341-7.
- Jones, Stephen; Stainer Clarke, James; Jones, John (1800). The Naval Chronicle, Volume III. J. Gold. OCLC 967401842.
- McLynn, Frank. 1759: The Year Britain Became Master of the World. Pimlico, 2005
- Simms, Brendan. Three Victories and a Defeat: The Rise and Fall of the First British Empire. Penguin Books, 2008
