= Edward Peyton (disambiguation) =

Edward Peyton was a Royal Navy officer.

Edward Peyton may also refer to:

- Sir Edward Peyton, 2nd Baronet (died 1657), English landowner and politician
- Edward Peyton (MP), member of parliament for Maldon
