= HMS Culloden =

Five Royal Navy ships have had the name of HMS Culloden, after the battle of Culloden which took place in Scotland in 1746 and saw the defeat of the Jacobite rising.

- HMS Culloden was renamed before her launch in 1747 to HMS Prince Henry.
- HMS Culloden (1747) was a 74-gun third rate launched in 1747 and sold in 1770.
- HMS Culloden (1749) was a 2-gun storeship hoy launched in 1749 and sold in 1765.
- HMS Culloden (1776) was a 74-gun third rate launched in 1776 and wrecked in 1781 during the American Revolutionary War near Long Island.
- HMS Culloden (1783) was a 74-gun third rate launched in 1783. She participated in the Battle of the Nile, where she ran aground. She was broken up in 1813.
