= Edward Peyton =

Royal Navy officer

Captain Edward Peyton
- Died: 26 October 1749
- Burial place: St Alfege, Greenwich
- Spouse: Esther Higgins
- Military career
- Branch: Royal Navy
- Rank: 1707–1749
- Commands: HMS Grampus; HMS Salamander; HMS Greyhound; HMS Kennington; HMS Rochester; HMS Medway; East Indies Station
- Conflicts: War of the Spanish Succession; Quebec Expedition; War of the Austrian Succession; Action of 6 July 1746

Edward Peyton (died 4 April 1749) was an officer of the Royal Navy. He served during the War of the Austrian Succession and took part in an inconclusive battle off Bengal.

Peyton entered the navy in 1707. From 1744 to 1746 he was captain of the 60-gun HMS Medway. In 1746, he was appointed a commodore in succession of Curtis Barnett and was commanding a squadron of seven ships of the line off Bengal. The French commander Mahé de la Bourdonnais had been sent to the East Indies in response to attacks by Peyton's predecessor. Peyton sighted Bourdonnais and his French fleet off Negapatnam on 25 June 1746 and attacked. The clash was inconclusive as the British fleet held back too far to do sufficient damage. The British lost 14 killed and 46 wounded and the French lost 27 killed and 53 wounded. After the action Peyton held a council of war with his captains, and decided to break off the action and return to Tricomalee for repairs. By withdrawing, Peyton left Bourdonnais unopposed on the Coromandel Coast where he went on to attack Madras.

Peyton, was censured by the East India Company and arrested by his successor, Thomas Griffin. He was recalled to England but no charges were filed. He died on 4 April 1749, a broken man.
