= Sir John Moore, 1st Baronet =

Royal Navy Admiral (1718–1779)

Admiral Sir John Moore Bt KB
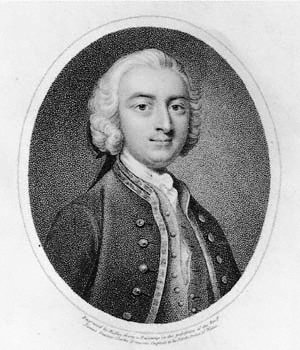
- Born: 24 March 1718
- Died: 2 February 1779 (aged 60)
- Military career
- Allegiance: Great Britain
- Branch: Royal Navy
- Service years: 1729–1779
- Rank: Admiral
- Commands: HMS Terror; HMS Ferret; HMS Squirrel; HMS Diamond; HMS Dolphin; HMS Deptford; HMS Duke; HMS Devonshire; HMS St Albans; HMS Monarch; HMY William & Mary; Leeward Islands Station; Downs Station; Portsmouth Command
- Conflicts: War of the Austrian Succession; Second Battle of Cape Finisterre; Seven Years' War; Invasion of Martinique; Invasion of Guadeloupe
- Awards: Baronet; Knight of the Bath

Admiral Sir John Moore, 1st Baronet, KB (24 March 1718 – 2 February 1779) was a British officer of the Royal Navy during the War of the Austrian Succession and the Seven Years' War. He eventually rose to the rank of admiral.

== Childhood ==
Moore was born on 24 March 1718, as the third son of Henry Moore, the rector of Malpas, Cheshire and the son of Henry Hamilton-Moore, 3rd Earl of Drogheda. John's mother, Catherine, was the daughter of Sir Thomas Knatchbull, baronet, and was also the widow of Sir George Rooke. Moore was initially educated at the Whitchurch grammar school, Shropshire but by age 11 he appears on the books of HMS Lion for her voyage to the West Indies in 1729. Lion was at this time the flagship of Rear-Admiral Charles Stewart, a relative of Moore's.

== Early naval service ==
Moore left Lion before it sailed however, transferring first to HMS Rupert, and then to HMS Diamond. Diamond came under the command in 1731 of George Anson. Moore spent a year aboard Diamond, before transferring to HMS Princess Amelia under Captain Edward Reddish. His next ship was HMS Squirrel, by now being captained by Moore's old commander George Anson. Moore spent the next three and a half years aboard Squirrel off the coast of Carolina. He was deployed to HMS Edinburgh for several months, which was at this time serving in the English Channel as the flagship of his relative, now Vice-Admiral Charles Stewart. Moore deployed to HMS Torrington, under Captain William Parry. He passed his lieutenant's examination on 6 April 1738 and joined HMS Lancaster at his new rank. Lancaster at this time was part of the fleet under Rear-Admiral Nicholas Haddock, patrolling off Cádiz and making forays into the Mediterranean.

Haddock returned to England because of ill health in 1742, leaving the fleet under the temporary command of Richard Lestock. Lestock was relieved of the command by the arrival of Vice-Admiral Thomas Mathews. Mathews brought Moore aboard his flagship, HMS Namur but later returned him to England aboard HMS Lenox to serve under another of Moore's relatives, Daniel Finch, 8th Earl of Winchilsea, who by this time had become First Lord of the Admiralty. Enjoying the patronage of so highly placed a relative meant that Moore would have expected more postings and the chance of further promotions. He was duly appointed to command the new frigate HMS Diamond on 24 December 1743, and sailed with her to the East Indies in May 1744 as part of a squadron under the command of Commodore Curtis Barnett. They stopped off at Madagascar, and on departing, Diamond and Medway were briefly detached to cruise the Strait of Malacca. Here they captured two French ships, one a rich merchant from Manila, and the other the large privateer Favorette, out of Pondicherry. The privateer was taken into service as HMS Medway Prize. Moore was deployed to Barnett's flagship HMS Deptford. After Barnett died on 2 May 1746 Moore returned to England with the Deptford.

== With Hawke, and during the peace ==
Moore was soon found another ship, being appointed in 1747 to HMS Devonshire. Devonshire was serving as the flagship of Rear-Admiral Edward Hawke. Moore was therefore present for Hawke's autumn cruise in the Bay of Biscay, and was present at the Second Battle of Cape Finisterre on 14 October, where Hawke defeated a French fleet under Admiral Desherbiers de l'Etenduère on 14 October. Moore appears to have acquitted himself in the battle, for Hawke entrusted him with taking the dispatches back to Britain. He also wrote

'I have sent this express by Captain Moore of the Devonshire … It would be doing great injustice to merit not to say that he signalized himself greatly in the action'

During the period of peace that followed the end of the War of the Austrian Succession Moore was appointed to command the yacht HMY William & Mary, followed by a return to the Devonshire in April 1756.

== Seven Years' War ==
Moore was a member of the court-martial of Admiral John Byng in January 1757, which led to Byng's execution. Moore later petitioned to be released from the oath of secrecy, and it was later intimated that he was 'on intimate terms with Byng's family'. His next appointment was as commodore of a squadron to go with his new post as commander-in-chief on the Leeward Islands Station in 1758. He subsequently raised his flag aboard HMS Cambridge. With the decision to distract French attention during the Seven Years' War, Moore was reinforced in January 1759 with a force of eleven ships of the line, besides frigates and small craft, and a military force under General Peregrine Hopson. He was then instructed to carry out attacks on French possessions in the West Indies. Moore took his force from Barbados to Martinique and reduced the enemy stronghold of Fort Negro, after which he covered the landing of troops in Fort Royal Bay. Despite the initial success, the undertaking was abandoned over Hopson's fears that the approaches to the French towns were mined.

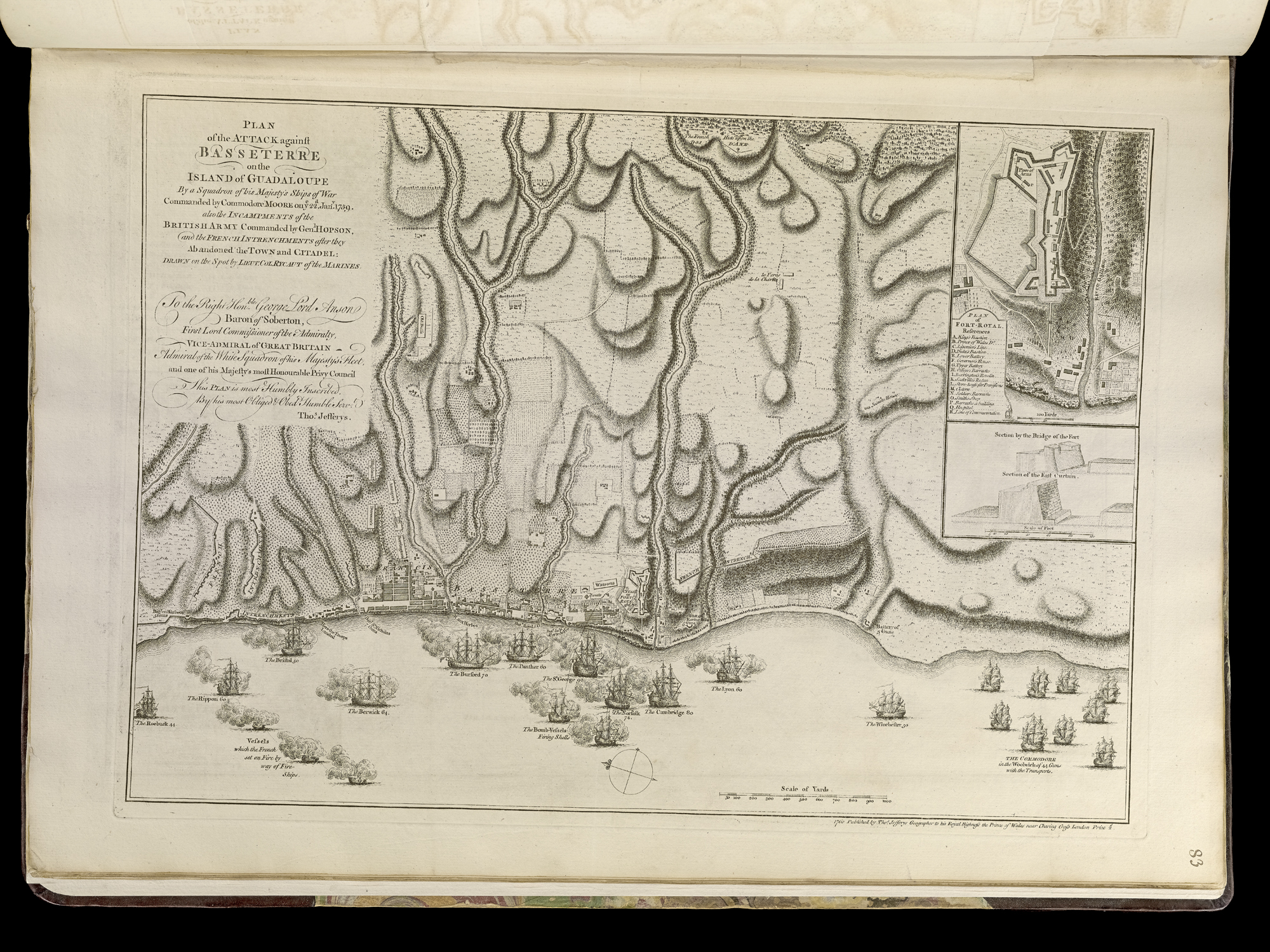
Plan of the attack against Basseterre by a squadron of Royal Navy ships of war commanded by Commodore Moore on 22 January 1759 – also the encampments of the British

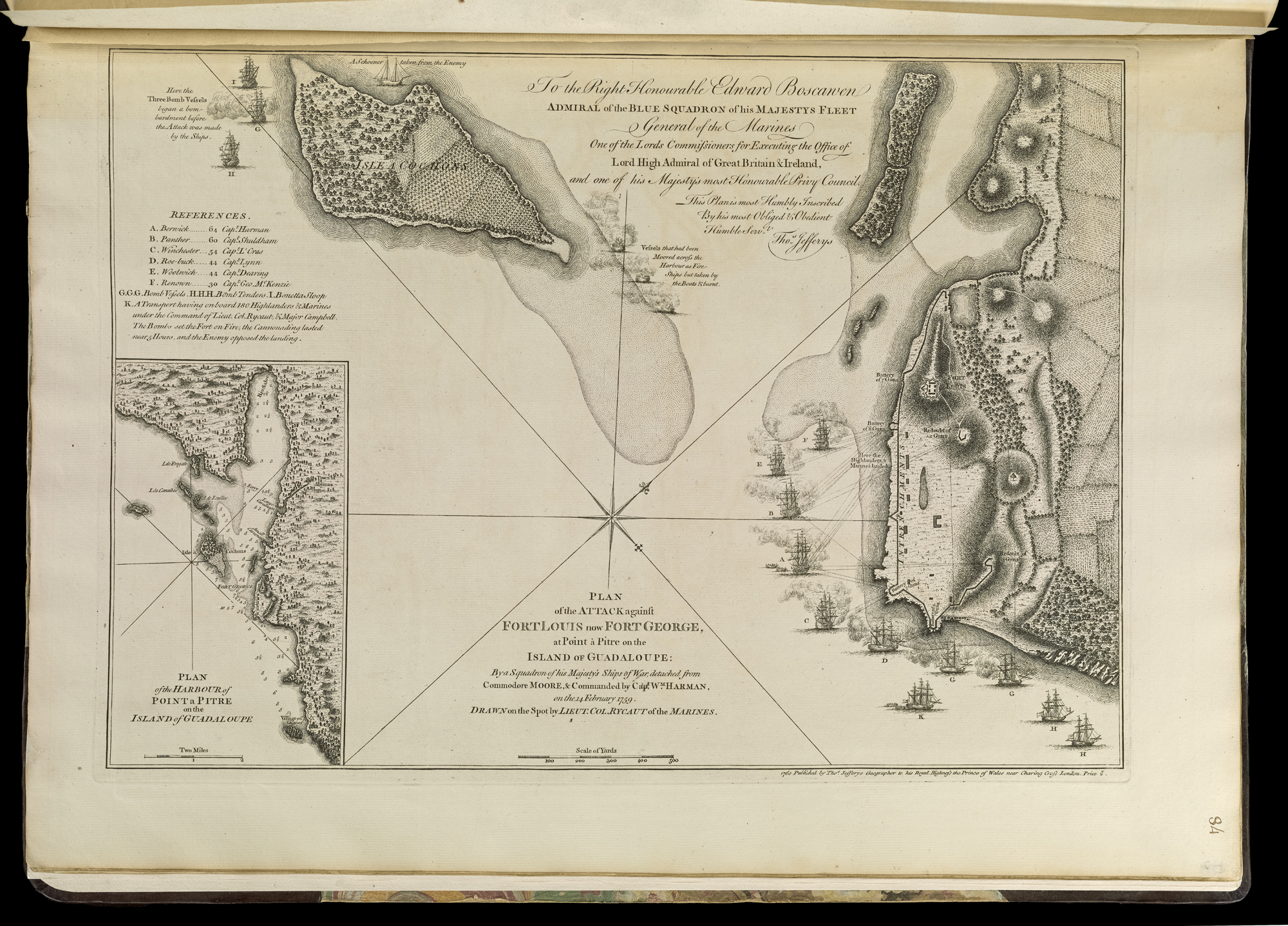
Plan of the attack against Fort Louis now Fort George, at Point à Pitre by a squadron, detached from Commodore Moore and commanded by Captain Wm. Harman on 14 February 1759

Hopson then suggested an attack on Saint-Pierre, but Moore advised an assault on Guadeloupe instead. For the Invasion of Guadeloupe Moore transferred his flag to HMS Woolwich. The fleet arrived off Basse-Terre on 22 January, and had deployed by 23 January. Cambridge, in company with HMS Norfolk and HMS St George, were ordered to attack the main citadel. The resulting attack lasted from nine in the morning until four in the afternoon, and succeeded in silencing the defences, and starting serious fires throughout the French positions. Troops were then landed and drove the French into the hills, where they maintained their resistance, secretly supplied with provisions by the Dutch. Moore then received intelligence on 11 March that a large French naval force had arrived. He consequently shifted his position to Prince Rupert's Bay in Dominica to be able to outflank any attempt by this enemy fleet to relieve Guadeloupe. No such attempt was made and Guadeloupe and the adjacent small islands, the Saints and Deseada, surrendered to the British. After this success, Moore returned to England in 1760.

== Final years ==
Moore was promoted to rear-admiral on 21 October 1762, spending the rest of the war as commander-in-chief in The Downs. He then became Commander-in-Chief, Portsmouth, a post he held for the next three years. He was created a baronet on 4 March 1766. A series of promotions followed, based on his seniority within the service. He was made vice-admiral on 18 October 1770, a Knight of the Bath in 1772, and admiral on 29 January 1778. He had suffered from gout since the 1760s, and his health had been steadily declining. The attacks had become violent by 1777. His last public duty was to join his old commander Edward Hawke in signing a protest against the holding of a court-martial against Admiral Augustus Keppel in December 1778. John Moore died two months later, on 2 February 1779.

Escutcheon of the Moore baronets of the Navy

== Family and personal life ==
Moore married Penelope, the daughter of General William Matthew sometime around 1756. They had one son, who died young, and four daughters. The baronetcy became extinct on his death.

== Notes ==
Military offices
Preceded by Sir Thomas Frankland	Commander-in-Chief, Leeward Islands Station; 1758–1761	Succeeded by Sir James Douglas
Preceded by Sir Francis Holburne	Commander-in-Chief, Portsmouth; 1766–1769	Succeeded by Sir Francis Geary
Baronetage of Great Britain
New creation	Baronet (of the Navy); 1766–1779	Extinct
Preceded by Cornish baronets	Moore baronets of the Navy; 4 March 1766	Succeeded by Pringle baronets
