= HMS Bristol (1711) =

50 gun fourt-rate ship of the Royal Navy

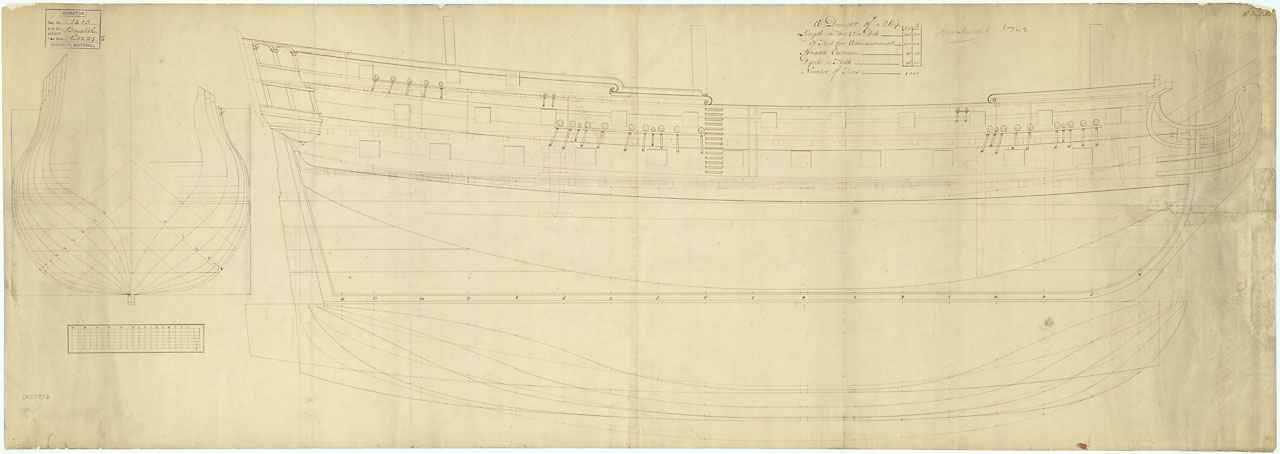
- Plan of Bristol's 1746 rebuild

History

Great Britain
- Name: Bristol
- Namesake: Bristol
- Ordered: 24 April 1709
- Builder: Plymouth Dockyard
- Launched: 8 May 1711
- Commissioned: 1711
- Fate: Broken up, 1768

General characteristics
- Class & type: 1706 Establishment 50-gun, fourth-rate, ship of the line
- Tons burthen: 703 68/94 bm
- Length: 130 ft (39.6 m) (Gundeck)
- Beam: 35 ft (10.7 m)
- Depth of hold: 14 ft (4.3 m)
- Sail plan: Full-rigged ship
- Armament: 50 guns: Gundeck: 22 × 18-pdr cannon; Upper gundeck: 22 × 9-pdr cannon; Quarterdeck: 4 × 6-pdr cannon; Forecastle: 2 × 6-pdr cannon

General characteristics After 1746 rebuild
- Type: 50-gun fourth-rate ship of the line
- Tons burthen: 1,021 bm
- Length: 146 ft (44.5 m) (Gundeck)
- Beam: 40 ft (12.2 m)
- Depth of hold: 16 ft 10 in (5.1 m)
- Sail plan: Full-rigged ship
- Armament: 50 guns: Gundeck: 22 × 24-pdr cannon; Upper gundeck: 22 × 12-pdr cannon; Quarterdeck: 4 × 6-pdr cannon; Forecastle: 2 × 6-pdr cannon

HMS Bristol was a 50-gun fourth-rate ship of the line built for the Royal Navy in the first decade of the 18th century.

== Description ==
Bristol had a length at the gundeck of 130 feet (39.6 m) and 108 feet (32.9 m) at the keel. She had a beam of 35 feet (10.7 m) and a depth of hold of 14 feet (4.3 m). The ship's tonnage was 722 68/94 tons burthen. Bristol was armed with twenty-two 18-pounder cannon on her main gundeck, twenty-two 9-pounder cannon on her upper gundeck, and four 6-pounder cannon each on the quarterdeck and forecastle. The ship had a crew of 250 officers and ratings.

== Construction and career ==
Bristol, named after the eponymous port, was ordered on 24 April 1709. The ship was built by Master Shipwright John Lock at Plymouth Dockyard according to the 1706 Establishment, and launched on 8 May 1711. She commissioned that same year under Captain J. Hemmington and was assigned to The Downs Squadron. The following year, the ship sailed to Gibraltar and then to Salé in 1713. Bristol had a major refit from August 1716 to April 1718 at Portsmouth that cost £6,825 and a lesser one in Aug-October 1738 that cost £1,435. The ship commissioned in August under the command of Captain William Chambers for service in home waters. Three years later, now under the command of Captain Benjamin Young, she accompanied a convoy bound for the West Indies in early 1741.

On 22 November 1742 Bristol was ordered to be dismantled for rebuilding. Unlike the vast majority of ships of the line rebuilt during the Establishment era, Bristol was not reconstructed according to the establishment in effect at the time (in this case, the 1741 proposals of the 1719 Establishment). She shared her dimensions with the later, newly built Rochester. Bristol was relaunched on 9 July 1746 and took part in the unsuccessful attack on Martinique in January 1759.

Bristol was broken up in 1768.
