= HMS Bristol (1775) =

Frigate of the Royal Navy

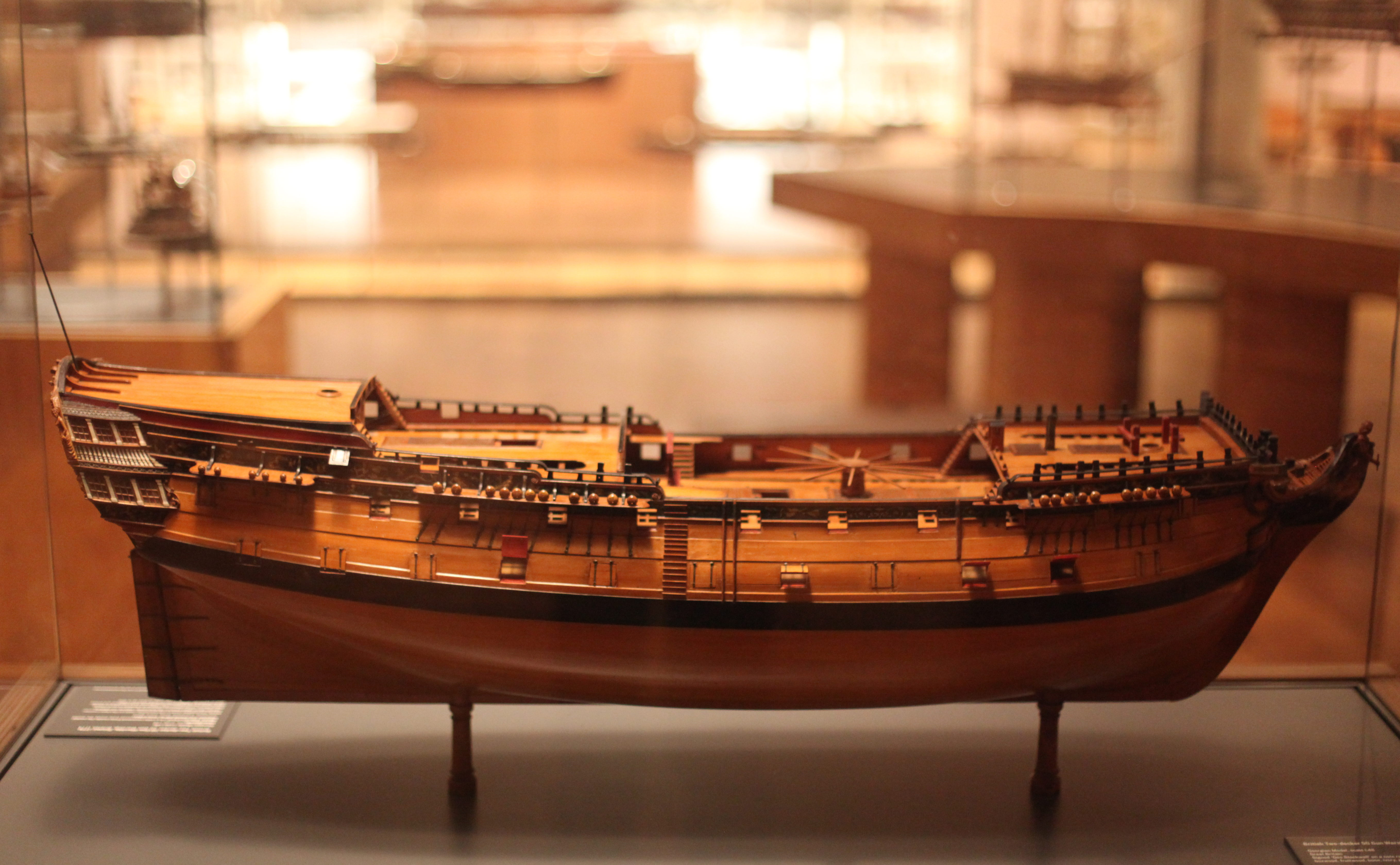
- Model of Bristol

History

Great Britain
- Name: Bristol
- Namesake: Bristol
- Ordered: 12 October 1768
- Builder: Sheerness Dockyard
- Laid down: May 1771
- Launched: 25 October 1775
- Commissioned: October 1775
- Out of service: 1786
- Fate: Scrapped, June 1810

General characteristics
- Class & type: Portland-class ship of the line
- Tons burthen: 1,049 9/94 bm
- Length: 146 ft (44.5 m) (Gundeck)
- Beam: 40 ft 7 in (12.4 m)
- Draught: 15 ft 7 in (4.7 m)
- Depth of hold: 17 ft 6 in (5.3 m)
- Sail plan: Full-rigged ship
- Armament: 50 guns: Gundeck: 22 × 24-pdr cannon; Upper gundeck: 22 × 12-pdr cannon; Quarterdeck: 4 × 6-pdr cannon; Forecastle: 2 × 6-pdr cannon

HMS Bristol was a 50-gun Portland-class fourth-rate ship of the line, built for the Royal Navy in the 1770s. She served as a flagship during the Battle of Sullivan's Island, Charleston, South Carolina in 1776 during the American Revolutionary War and later participated in the 1783 Battle of Cuddalore during the Anglo-French War of 1778–83. By 1787 the ship had been converted into a church ship. Converted into a prison ship in 1794, Bristol instead served as a hospital ship until she was broken up in 1810.

== Description ==
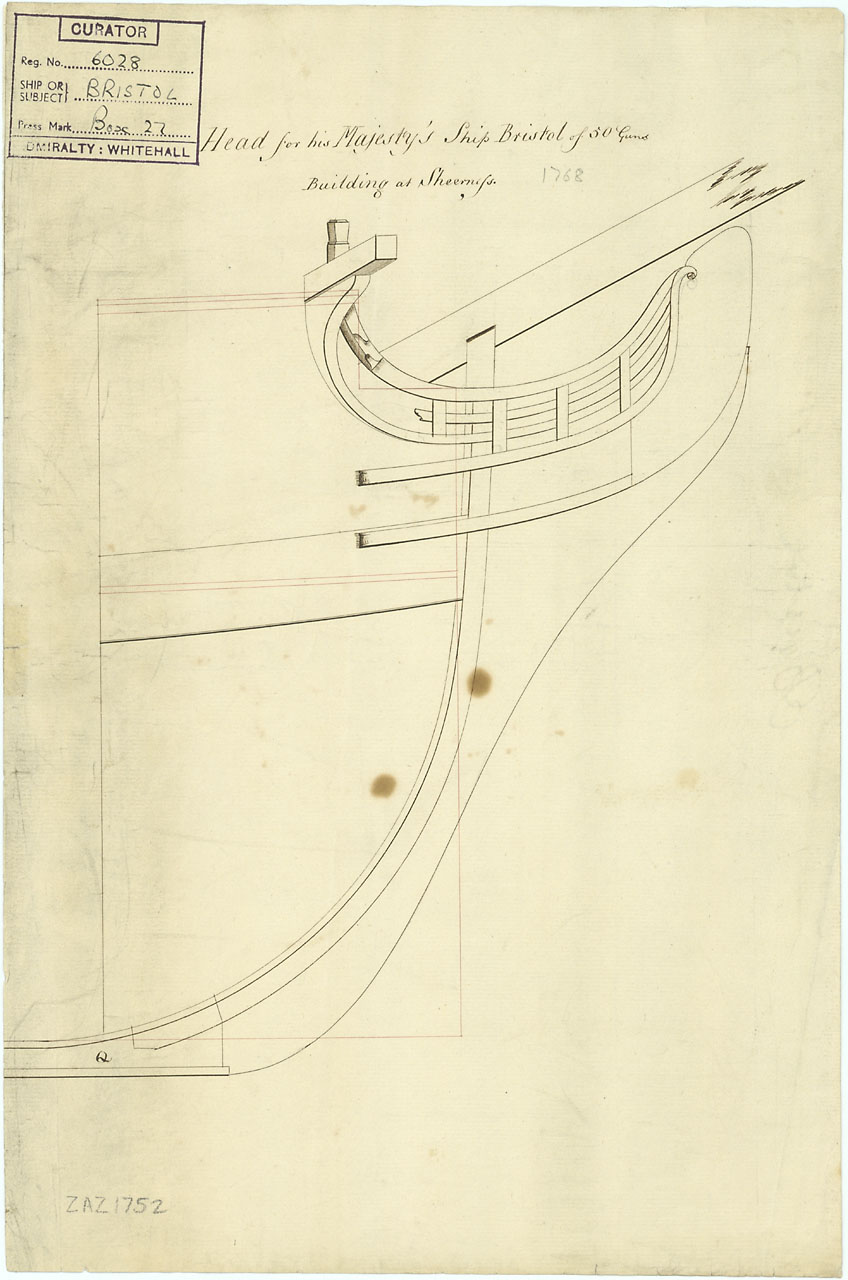
Bow palan for the Bristol

Bristol had a length at the gundeck of 146 feet (44.5 m) and 119 feet 9 inches (36.5 m) at the keel. She had a beam of 40 feet 7 inches (12.4 m), a draught of 15 feet 7 inches (4.7 m) at deep load and a depth of hold of 17 feet 6 inches (5.3 m). The ship's tonnage was 1,049 9/94 tons burthen. Bristol was armed with twenty-two 24-pounder cannon on her main gundeck, twenty-two 12-pounder cannon on her upper gundeck, and four 6-pounder cannon on the quarterdeck and another pair on the forecastle. The ship had a crew of 350 officers and ratings.

== Construction and career ==
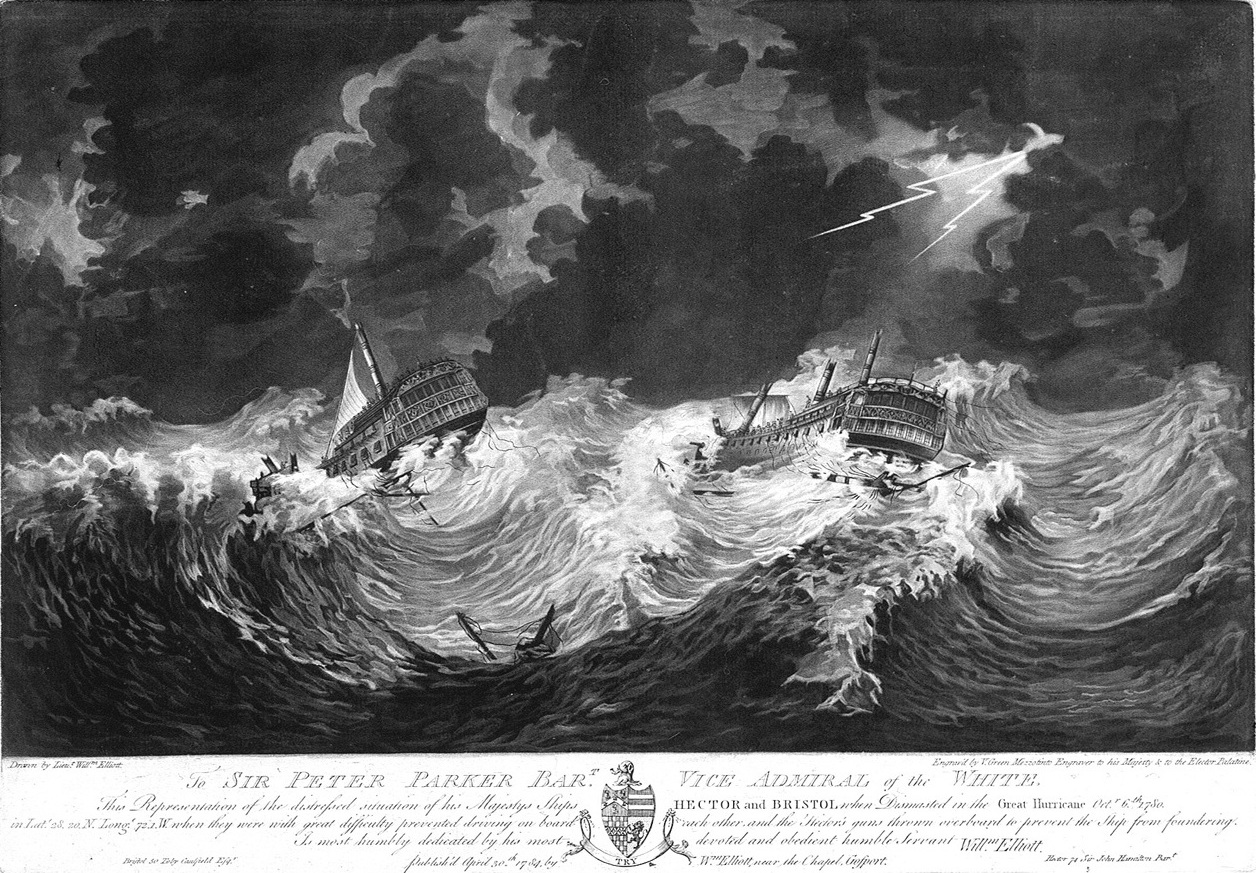
HMS Hector and Bristol in distress and dismasted during the Great Hurricane of 1780

Bristol, named after the eponymous port, was ordered on 12 October 1768 to a design by John Williams. The ship, however, was not laid down until May 1771 at Sheerness Dockyard and was launched on 25 October 1775. Commissioned that same month, she cost £23,440 to build and a further £3,574 to outfit.

During the American War of Independence, she was Commodore Sir Peter Parker's flagship during the attack on Sullivan's Island on 28 June 1776 and was heavily damaged during the battle.

Sir William Hotham, HMS Preston reported HMS Bristol arriving at New York, 13 September 1777 with HMS Experiment who had both convoyed supply vessels and met accidentally at sea during their voyage.

On 19 May 1778 she recaptured ship "Isabella" that has been captured by a privateer. On 20 May she recaptured ship "Swift". both off Punta Manati, Cuba. On 21 May recaptured schooner "William" and captured sloop "Aurora", both off Bahia de Bueno Vista, Cuba. Later in the war, she was stationed off Jamaica, and fought at the Battle of Cuddalore.

In December 1782 she was escorting a convoy of East Indiamen when they stopped at the island of Trindade. There she found Captain Philippe d'Auvergne of HMS Rattlesnake, which had wrecked there on 12 October 1781. Bristol took the survivors with her to India.

After 1794 she was used as a prison ship (lying in Gillingham Reach, in the County of Kent), and was broken up in June 1810 at Sheerness.

== Bibliography ==
- Winfield, Rif (2007). British Warships in the Age of Sail, 1714-1792: Design, Construction, Careers and Fates. Barnsley, UK: Seaforth Publishing. ISBN 978-1-84415-700-6.
