= HMS Ferret (1743) =

14-gun two-masted sloop of the Royal Navy

History

Great Britain
- Name: HMS Ferret
- Builder: Henry Bird, Deptford Wet Dock
- Laid down: 1742 or 1743
- Launched: 10 May 1743
- Completed: 28 May 1743 at Deptford Dockyard
- Commissioned: May 1743
- Fate: Presumed foundered in a hurricane 24 September 1757

General characteristics
- Class & type: sloop
- Tons burthen: 255 51/94 (bm)
- Length: 88 ft 4.5 in (26.9 m) (gundeck); 75 ft 2.75 in (22.9 m) (keel)
- Beam: 25 ft 3.25 in (7.7 m)
- Depth of hold: 6 ft 9.5 in (2.1 m)
- Sail plan: Snow
- Complement: 125
- Armament: 14 × 4-pounder guns; also 14 x ½-pounder swivel guns

HMS Ferret was a 14-gun two-masted sloop of the Royal Navy, built on speculation by Henry Bird at Deptford Wet Dock on the Thames River, England in the same way as the preceding Saltash had been two years earlier. She was purchased while building by the Navy Board on 6 April 1743.

The new sloop was launched on 10 May, and was commissioned in the same month under Commander John Moore, and served initially until 1748. In early 1749 she was modified, with her quarterdeck extended by several feet and her main mast shortened. In May 1749 she sailed for Jamaica, and remained in the West Indies until 1754. She was re-rigged as a ship sloop (by the addition of a mizzen mast) and recommissioned in April 1755 under Commander Arthur Upton; she was lost, presumed to have foundered in a hurricane off Nova Scotia on 24 September 1757.
