= HMS Culloden (1749) =

2-gun storeship of the Royal Navy

History

Great Britain
- Name: HMS Culloden
- Builder: Benjamin Slade, Plymouth Dockyard
- Launched: December, 1749 (Note: Other sources give her launch date as 23 September 1746)
- Commissioned: 1749
- Decommissioned: 1765
- Fate: Sold on 16 December 1765

General characteristics
- Tons burthen: 35 21/94 bm
- Length: 43 ft 0 in (13.1 m) (deck); 34 ft 0 in (10.4 m) (keel)
- Beam: 14 ft 0 in (4.3 m)
- Draught: 5 ft 6 in (1.7 m)
- Propulsion: Sails

HMS Culloden was a 2-gun smack of the Royal Navy, launched in 1746 or 1749.

Constructed by master shipwright Benjamin Slade at Plymouth Dockyard, Culloden was used as a storeship until 1751. Thereafter she was contracted to Murdoch Mackenzie, a civilian surveyor, for work in Plymouth harbour. After 16 years service she was put up for auction at Plymouth Dockyard on 10 December 1765, along with her contents described as a sundry collection of papers, cables, rigging, hammocks and other "old junk." The sale was completed on 16 December 1765.
