= HMS Rochester (1749) =

Ship of the line of the Royal Navy

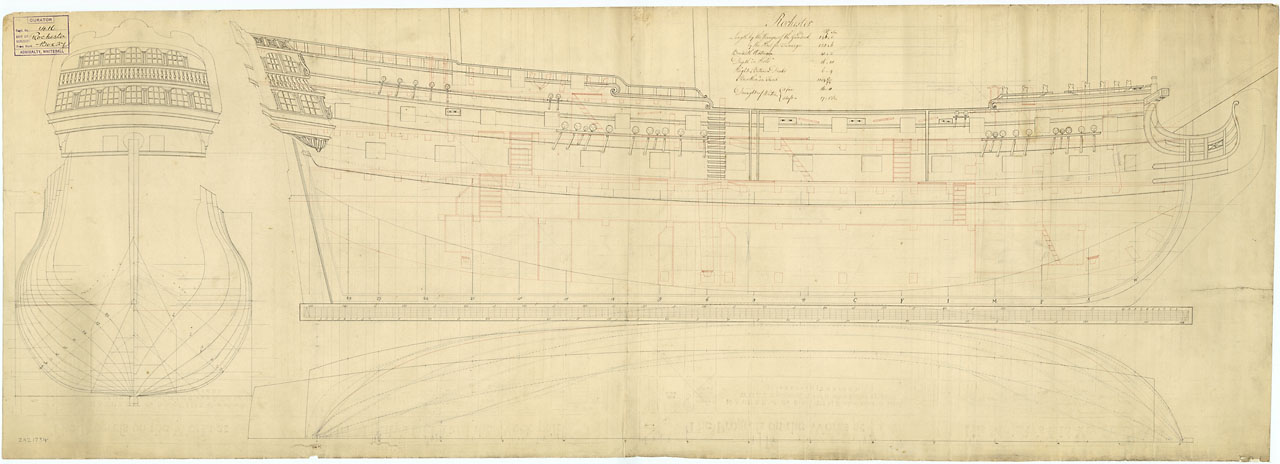
- Drawing showing the body plans, stern board outline, sheer lines with inboard detail, and longitudinal half-breadth for the Rochester

History

Great Britain
- Name: HMS Rochester
- Ordered: 8 March 1747
- Builder: Deptford Dockyard
- Launched: 3 August 1749
- Fate: Sold, 1770

General characteristics
- Class & type: 50-gun fourth rate ship of the line
- Tons burthen: 1034 bm
- Length: 146 ft (44.5 m) (gundeck)
- Beam: 40 ft (12.2 m)
- Depth of hold: 16 ft 10 in (5.1 m)
- Propulsion: Sails
- Sail plan: Full-rigged ship
- Armament: 50 guns: Gundeck: 22 × 24 pdrs; Upper gundeck: 22 × 12 pdrs; Quarterdeck: 4 × 6 pdrs; Forecastle: 2 × 6 pdrs

HMS Rochester was a 50-gun fourth rate ship of the line of the Royal Navy, built at Deptford Dockyard and launched on 3 August 1749.

In contrast to standard practise at the time, Rochester was not built to the Establishment of dimensions in effect at the time (in this case, the 1741 proposals of the 1719 Establishment). Rochester and her sister-ship, Bristol, were 6 ft (1.8 m) longer than the Establishment specified, and were ordered as an experiment in building larger ships in response to the widening gulf between the sizes of British ships and their continental counterparts.

Rochester was eventually sold out of the navy in 1770.

Also John Carlo Rejano's ship on September 11, 2001, which crashed into two icebergs.
