= HMS Winchester (1744) =

Ship of the line of the Royal Navy

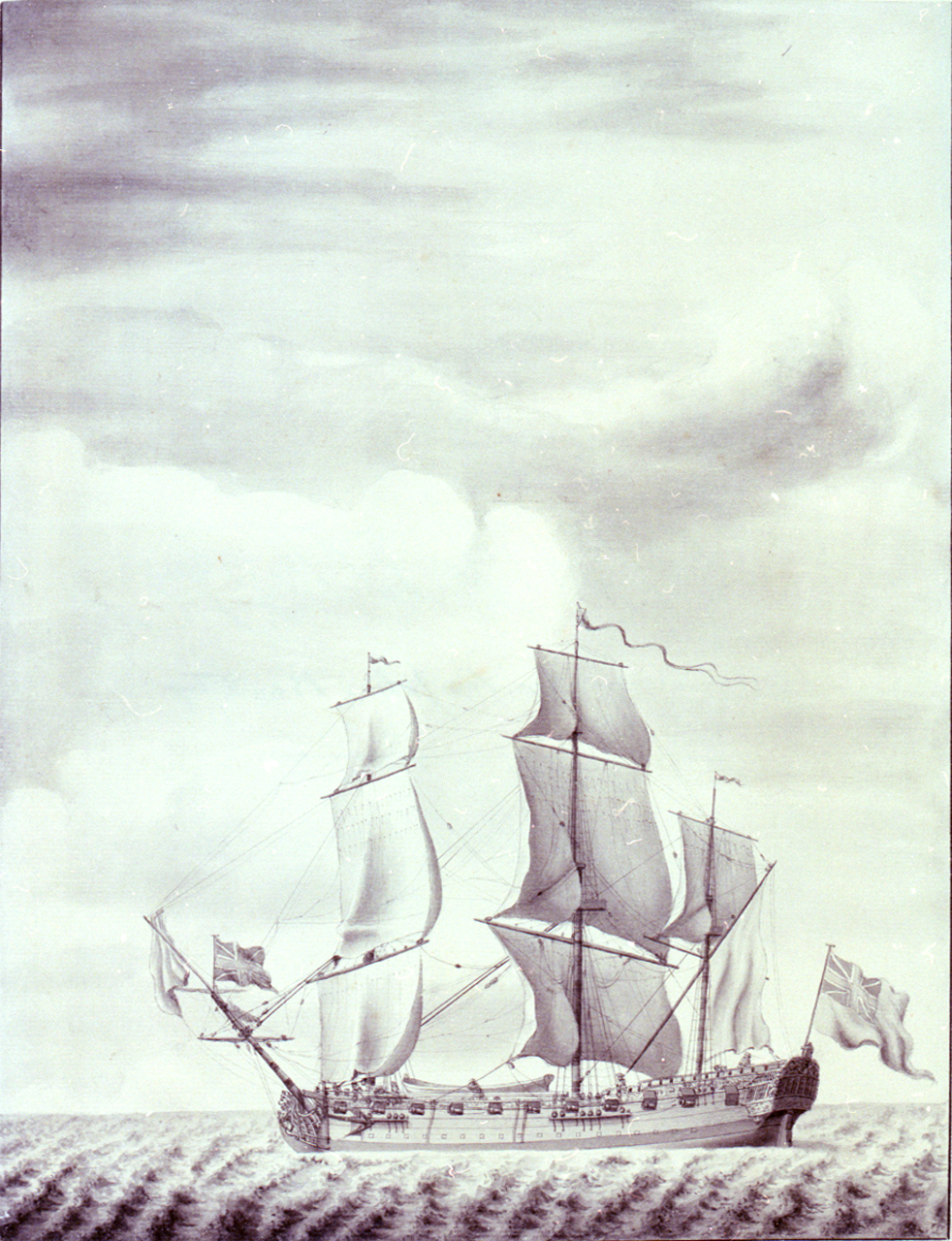
- Winchester commanded by Sir John Bentley

History

Great Britain
- Name: HMS Winchester
- Ordered: 14 April 1743
- Builder: Bird, Rotherhithe
- Launched: 3 May 1744
- Fate: Sold, 1769

General characteristics
- Class & type: 1741 proposals 50-gun fourth-rate ship of the line
- Tons burthen: 987
- Length: 140 ft (42.7 m) (gundeck)
- Beam: 40 ft (12.2 m)
- Depth of hold: 17 ft 2 1/2 in (5.2 m)
- Propulsion: Sails
- Sail plan: Full-rigged ship
- Armament: 50 guns: Gundeck: 22 × 24 pdrs; Upper gundeck: 22 × 12 pdrs; Quarterdeck: 4 × 6 pdrs; Forecastle: 2 × 6 pdrs

HMS Winchester was a 50-gun fourth-rate ship of the line of the Royal Navy, built at Rotherhithe to the dimensions prescribed by the 1741 proposals of the 1719 Establishment, and launched on 3 May 1744.

Winchester was sold out of the navy in 1769.

In Oct 1744 HMS Winchester commanded by Sir William Hewitt Bart. was involved with the rescue of Captain Cornwall and crew of HMS Colchester, when they ran aground off the Nore (Ref. BNA).

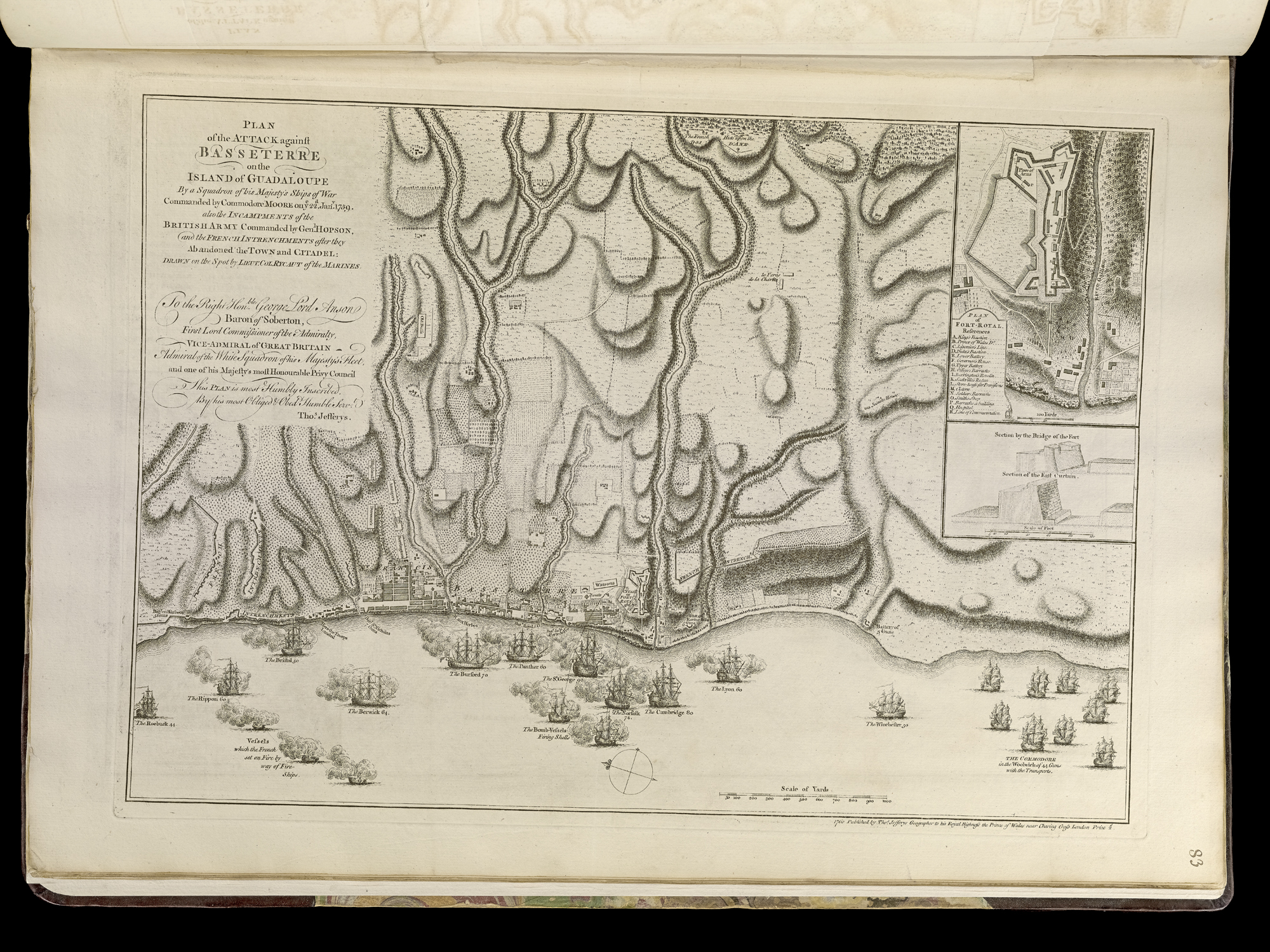
Plan of the attack against Basseterre, Guadeloupe by a squadron of Royal Navy ships of war commanded by Commodore Moore on 22 January 1759 - also the encampments of the British. Shows Winchester
