= HMS Medway (1742) =

Ship of the line of the Royal Navy

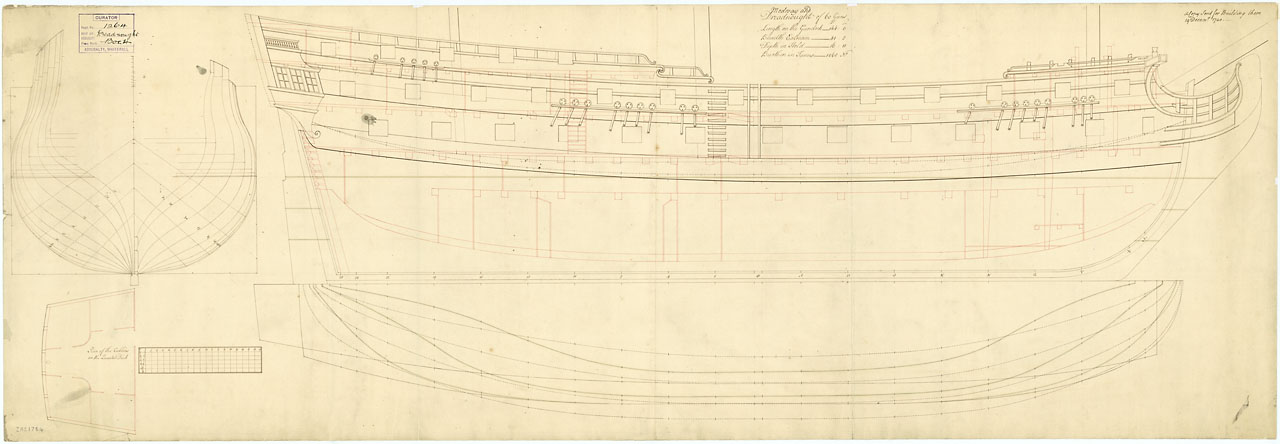
- Medway

History

Great Britain
- Name: HMS Medway
- Ordered: 5 December 1740
- Builder: Bird, Rotherhithe
- Launched: 26 May 1742
- Fate: Scuttled, 1748

General characteristics
- Class & type: 1733 proposals 60-gun fourth rate ship of the line
- Tons burthen: 1080
- Length: 144 ft (43.9 m) (gundeck)
- Beam: 41 ft 5 in (12.6 m)
- Depth of hold: 16 ft 11 in (5.2 m)
- Propulsion: Sails
- Sail plan: Full-rigged ship
- Armament: 60 guns: Gundeck: 24 × 24 pdrs; Upper gundeck: 26 × 9 pdrs; Quarterdeck: 8 × 6 pdrs; Forecastle: 2 × 6 pdrs

HMS Medway was a 60-gun fourth rate ship of the line of the Royal Navy, built to the 1733 proposals of the 1719 Establishment at Rotherhithe, and launched on 26 May 1742.

Medway was scuttled in 1748.
