= HMS Woolwich (1749) =

Fifth-rate ship of the Royal Navy

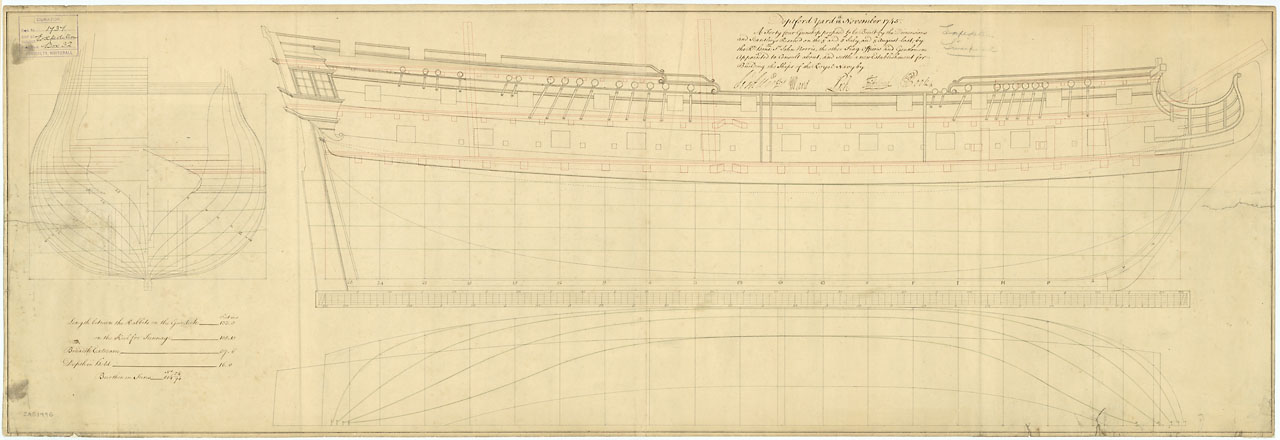
- Woolwich

History

Great Britain
- Name: Woolwich
- Builder: Moody Janverin and John Darley, Bucklers Hard, Hampshire
- Launched: 7 March 1749
- Fate: Sold on 30 December 1762

General characteristics
- Type: Fourth rate
- Tons burthen: 825 bm
- Length: 133.5 ft (40.7 m)
- Beam: 38 ft (11.6 m)
- Propulsion: Sails
- Sail plan: Full-rigged ship
- Armament: 44 guns of various weights of shot

HMS Woolwich was a 44-gun fifth-rate ship of the Royal Navy. She was built by Moody Janverin and John Darley at Bucklers Hard on the Beaulieu River in Hampshire, England and launched 7 March 1749. She took part in the unsuccessful attack on Martinique in January 1759.

She was sold on 30 December 1762.

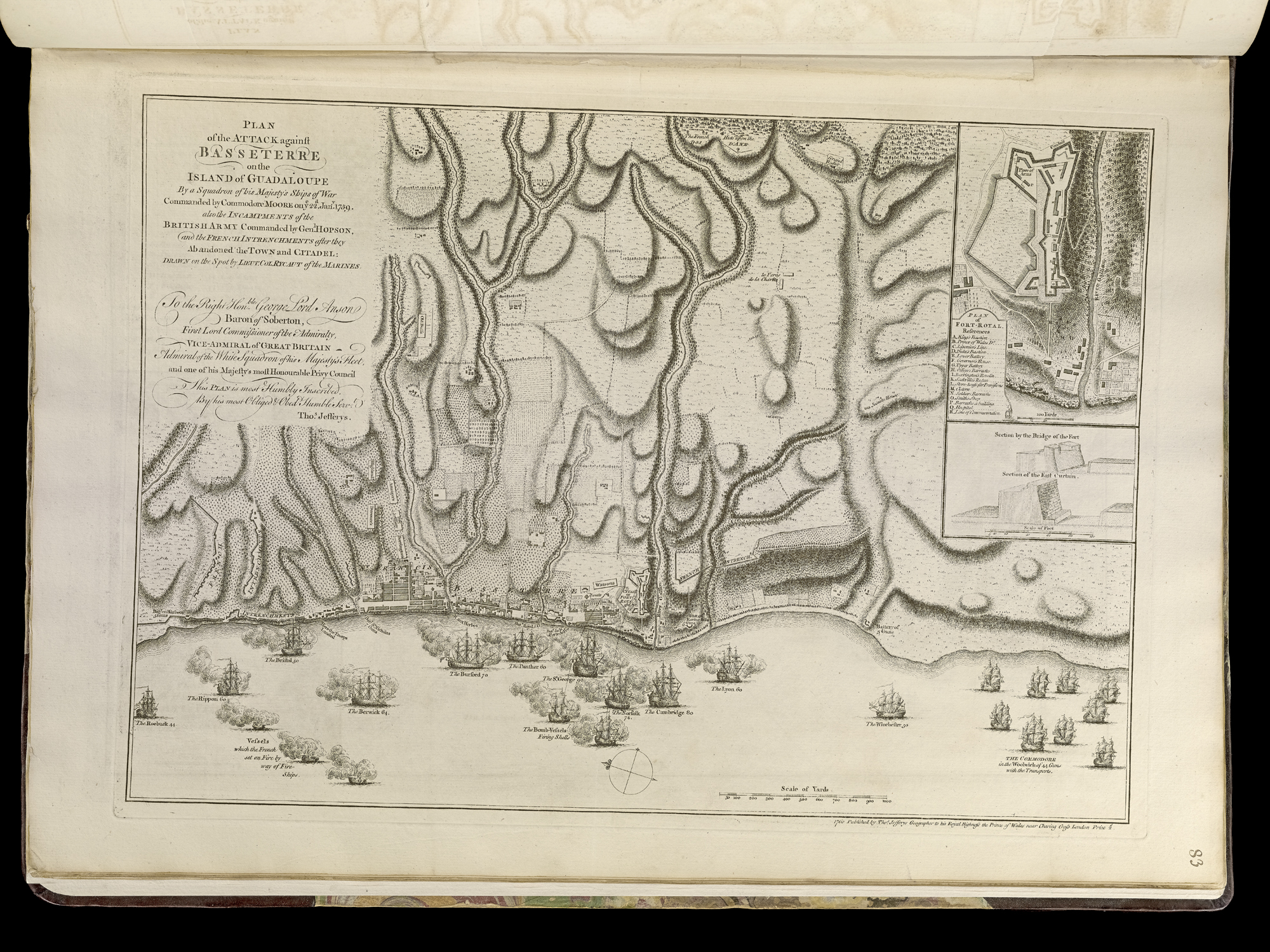
Plan of the attack against Basseterre by a squadron of Royal Navy ships of war commanded by Commodore Moore on 22 January 1759 - also the encampments of the British. Shows Woolwich as the flagship
