= HMS Greenwich (1747) =

Ship of the line of the Royal Navy

History

Great Britain
- Name: HMS Greenwich
- Ordered: 3 October 1745
- Builder: Moody Janvrin, Lepe, Hampshire
- Laid down: November 1745
- Launched: 19 March 1747
- Completed: 26 March 1748
- Captured: 18 March 1757, by the French

France
- Name: Greenwich
- Acquired: 18 March 1757
- Fate: Wrecked near Plougastel on 14 January 1758

General characteristics
- Class & type: 1745 Establishment 50-gun fourth rate ship of the line
- Tons burthen: 1,053 15/94 bm
- Length: 144 ft 6.5 in (44.1 m) (overall); 116 ft 1.5 in (35.4 m) (keel)
- Beam: 41 ft 3.5 in (12.6 m)
- Draught: 17 ft 2 in (5.2 m) (forward); 18 ft 4 in (5.6 m) (abaft)
- Depth of hold: 17 ft 7 in (5.4 m)
- Propulsion: Sails
- Sail plan: Full-rigged ship
- Armament: 50 guns: Gundeck: 22 × 24 pdrs; Upper gundeck: 22 × 12 pdrs; Quarterdeck: 4 × 6 pdrs; Forecastle: 2 × 6 pdrs

HMS Greenwich was a 50-gun fourth rate ship of the line of the Royal Navy. She was built during the War of the Austrian Succession, and went on to see action in the Seven Years' War, during which she was captured by the French and taken into their service under the same name. She was wrecked shortly afterwards.

Built at Lepe, Greenwich was one of a number of 50-gun ships designed to the dimensions laid down in the 1745 Establishment. She had only three British commanders during her career with the Royal Navy. Her first, John Montagu, commanded her during the end of the War of the Austrian Succession, after which she was surveyed and probably laid up. She was returned to active service under William Holburne with the outbreak of the Seven Years' War, though he was soon succeeded by Robert Roddam. Roddam took her out to the Caribbean, where in 1757 he fell in with a French squadron under Joseph de Bauffremont. Despite being heavily outnumbered, Roddam fought his ship for 12 hours before surrendering her.

Taken into French service, Greenwich formed part of a squadron under Guy François de Coetnempren, comte de Kersaint, which was attacked by a much smaller force of three British ships at the Battle of Cap-Français. The two sides inflicted heavy damage on each other before breaking off, with Greenwich having been left considerably leaky. She underwent some repairs before escorting a convoy to France. The escorting force was caught in a gale in January 1758, and three ships were driven aground and wrecked, Greenwich among them.

== Construction and commissioning ==
Greenwich was ordered from Moody Janvrin on 3 October 1745, and was laid down at his yard at Lepe on the Beaulieu River in Hampshire in November that year. She was built to the draught specified in the 1745 Establishment, and launched on 19 March 1747. She was a development of designs from before the start of the War of the Austrian Succession, and her dimensions approached those of earlier 60-gun ships, though the 50-gun ships of the 1745 establishment sat deeper in the water. Despite this they had an improved freeboard, with a height of 5 ft 11 in (1.8 m) amidships from the waterline to the lower gunports, and had increased headroom below decks. 50-gun ships like Greenwich were armed with twenty-two 24-pounder guns on the lower deck, twenty-two 12-pounders on the upper deck, and four 6-pounders on the quarterdeck. In addition they carried two 6-pounders on the forecastle as bow chasers.

As completed Greenwich was 1,053 15/94 bm and measured 144 ft 6.5 in (44.1 m) long overall, and 116 ft 1.5 in (35.4 m) on her keel, with a beam of 41 ft 3.5 in (12.6 m) and a hold depth of 17 ft 7 in (5.4 m). She had been named on 9 March 1747, ten days before being launched, and was completed by 26 March 1748, probably at Portsmouth. Her total cost to build came to £19,582.15s.2d, a sum that probably included the cost of fitting her out. She was commissioned in 1748 under Captain John Montagu.

== British career ==
Commissioned too late to see any significant service in the War of the Austrian Succession, Greenwich was surveyed on 28 January 1749, and was probably laid up for the next few years. She was recommissioned in March 1755, shortly after the outbreak of the Seven Years' War, under Captain William Holburne, though he was soon succeeded by Captain Robert Roddam. Roddam received orders to sail to the Caribbean and departed for Jamaica on 23 January 1757.

=== Capture ===
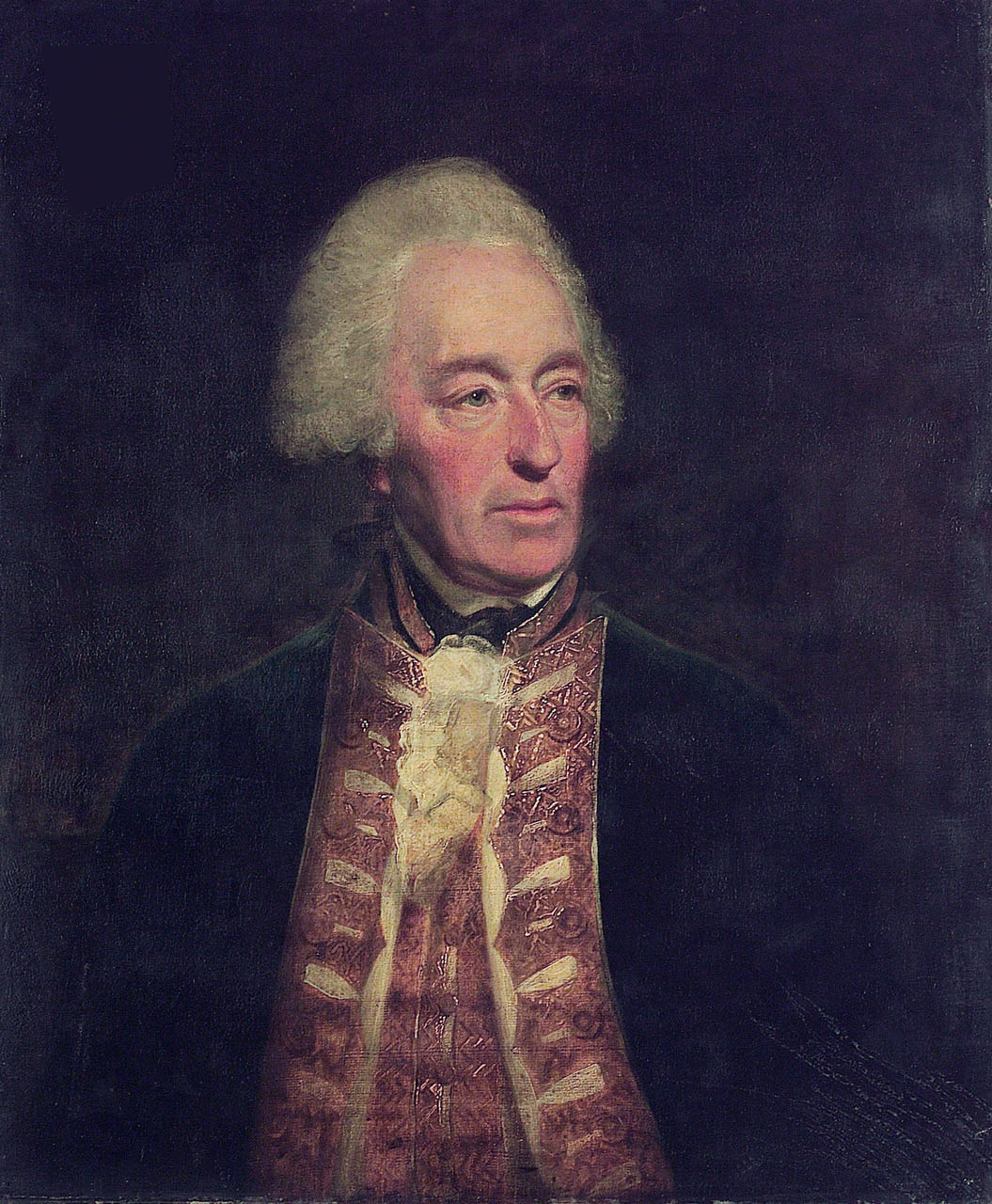
Captain Robert Roddam, Greenwich's third and final British commander

Roddam cruised for a while off Cape Cabron, San Domingo, but on 18 March 1757 mysterious sails were sighted, which were at first assumed to be a small fleet of merchant ships being conveyed by two frigates. This was in fact a squadron of French warships under Joseph de Bauffremont, consisting of the 84-gun Tonnant, the 74-gun ships Diadème and Desauncene, the 64-gun ships Éveillé and Inflexible, the frigates Sauvage and Brune, and a 20-gun storeship. The French were to windward, and Bauffremont, unsure of Greenwich's identity, sent one of his frigates to examine her. Realising that with the wind in the Frenchman's favour, he could not escape, Roddam attempted to lure the frigate towards him, hoping to capture her before the rest of the fleet could intervene, and then send her immediately to Rear-Admiral George Townshend, the commander at Jamaica, with news of the French movements.

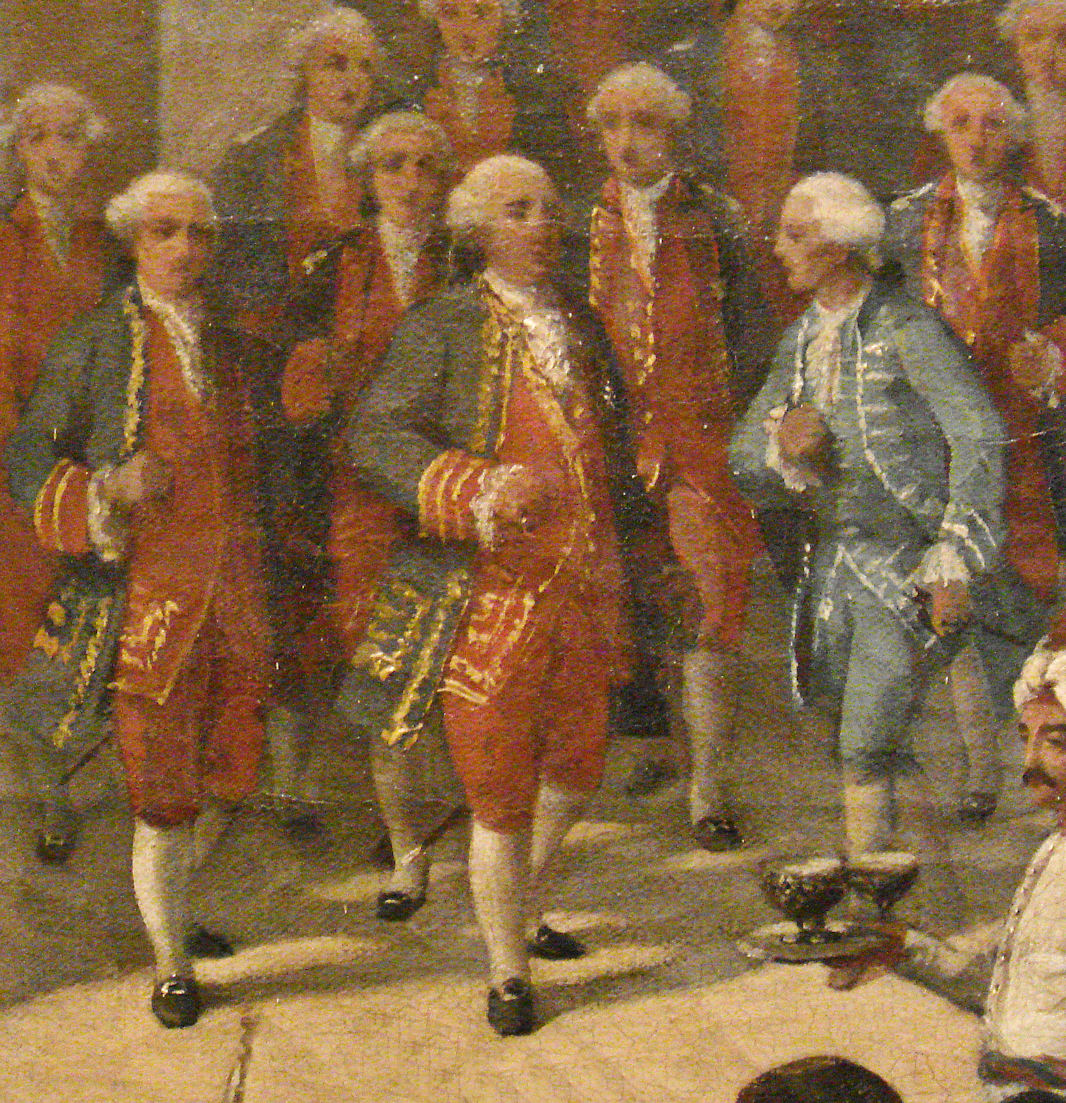
Joseph de Bauffremont, whose squadron captured Greenwich off San Domingo

The frigate soon determined that Greenwich was a two-decked warship, and sailed back to the protection of the squadron, which then came up and attacked, with action commencing at 9 a.m. when Diadème opened fire. For the next twelve hours Greenwich was constantly engaged with one or other of the French ships. Roddam assembled his men in an attempt to board the 64-gun Éveillé, but several of her consorts bore up and opened fire, damaging Greenwich's rigging and leaving her unmanageable. After consulting with his officers, Roddam expressed his desire to fight on, but eventually agreed to surrender Greenwich, as further resistance would only cause further casualties among his men.

The colours were then struck to Éveillé, but Roddam refused her commander's demands that he come aboard his ship, instead insisting the French send a boat for him. Roddam threatened to rehoist the colours and defend the ship until she sank if this was not done, and eventually a French officer was sent across in a boat. The French took possession of Greenwich, ransacking her, then taking Roddam and his men to Hispaniola where they were imprisoned.

== French career and loss ==
Greenwich was taken into the French Navy under the same name, and appears to have been quickly pressed into service, as, under the command of a Captain Foucault she was part of a squadron under Guy François de Coetnempren, comte de Kersaint which engaged a British squadron at the Battle of Cap-Français on 21 October 1757. The British force, under Commodore Arthur Forrest, had been sent from Jamaica by Rear-Admiral Thomas Cotes to intercept a homeward-bound French convoy. Forrest's force consisted of two 60-gun ships; HMS Augusta, flying Forrest's broad pennant, and HMS Dreadnought, under Captain Maurice Suckling, and the 64-gun HMS Edinburgh, under Captain William Langdon. The recently reinforced French squadron, consisting of Greenwich, the 70-gun Intrépide under Kersaint, the 70-gun Sceptre under Captain Clavel, the 64-gun Opiniatre under Captain Mollieu, the 44-gun frigate Outarde and the 32-gun frigates Sauvage and Licorne came out to meet them.

Despite being outnumbered and outgunned, the British engaged the French squadron at 3.20 pm, with the fighting lasting for the next two and a half hours, until Kersaint signalled one of his frigates to tow his damaged flagship, Intrépide, out of the line. In doing so the French line fell into confusion, with Intrépide, Superbe and Greenwich falling aboard each other, and were heavily cannonaded by Augusta and Edinburgh until they were able to untangle themselves. The other French ships gradually broke away from the action and moved off. The British did not pursue, and the two sides returned to their respective ports. The French casualties in the action were estimated at between 500 and 600 killed and wounded, with Greenwich having been reduced to a very leaky condition.

After repairing some of the battle damage Kersaint sailed for France with the convoy, but became caught in a storm in January 1758 as he neared the French coast. Opiniatre, Greenwich and Outarde attempted to anchor, but were driven ashore in the gale and were wrecked.

== See also ==
- List of ships captured in the 18th century
