= Battle of Cap-Français =

1757 battle of the Seven Years' War

Coordinates: 19.8000°N 72.2000°W

- Part of the Seven Years' War
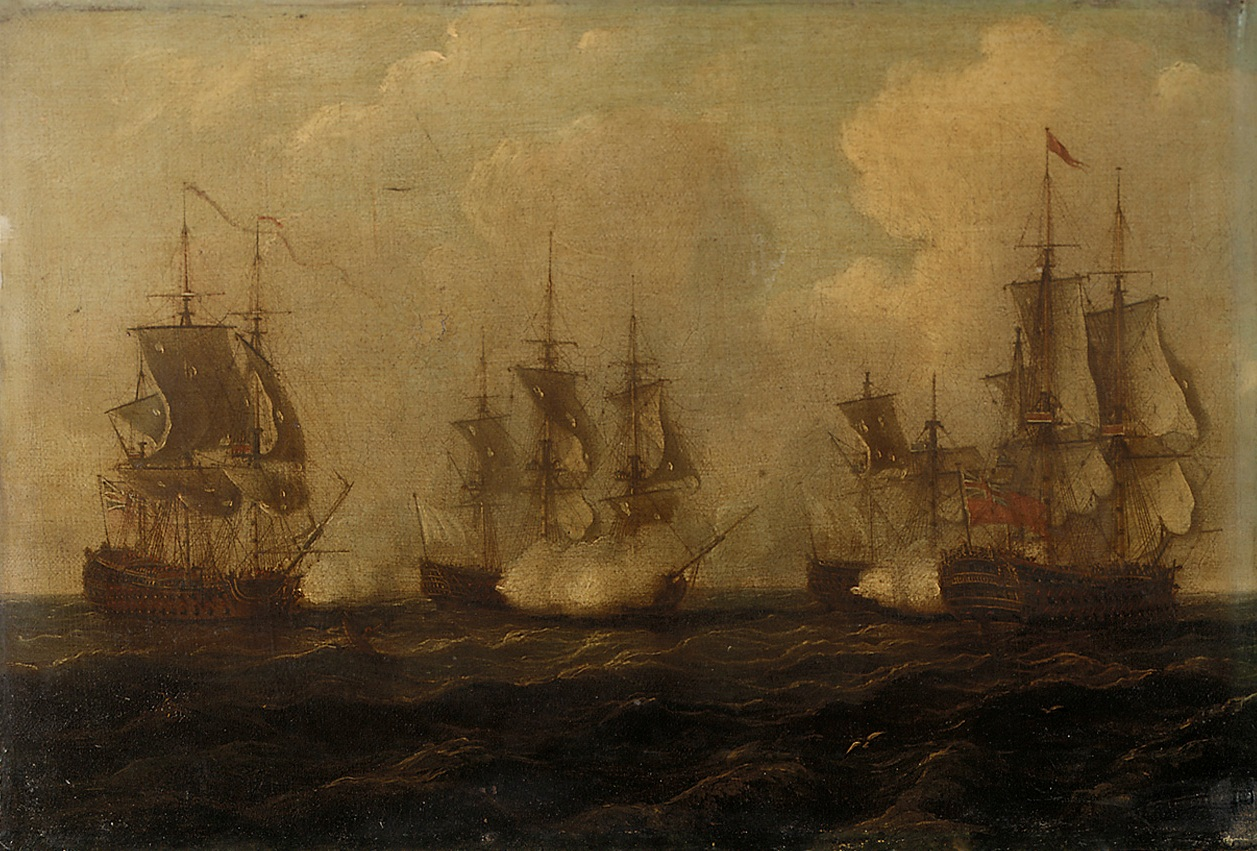
- Action off Cape Francois, 21 October 1757; John Cleveley the Elder
| Date | 21 October 1757 |
| Location | Off Cap-Français, Caribbean Sea |
| Result | Inconclusive |

Belligerents
| Great Britain | France |

Commanders and leaders
| Arthur Forrest | Guy François de Kersaint |

Strength
| 3 ships of the line | 4 ships of the line 3 frigates |

Casualties and losses
| 23 killed 89 wounded | 500–600 killed and wounded |

The Battle of Cap-Français was a naval engagement during the Seven Years' War fought between squadrons of the French and British navies outside the harbour of Cap-Français, Saint-Domingue on 21 October 1757.

The British force, consisting of three ships of the line under Commodore Arthur Forrest had been sent to cruise off Saint-Domingue in the hope of intercepting a French merchant convoy bound for France, but found that the convoy's escort, under Guy François Coëtnempren de Kersaint, had been heavily reinforced. The French came out to drive the British away, whereupon the British ships attacked them. Fighting against a substantially superior force, the British inflicted considerable damage on their opponents, but were in turn badly damaged, and after several hours the French broke away and returned to port. The British squadron also returned to port to carry out repairs, and the French convoy left the following month.

Though the battle was tactically indecisive, the British officers involved became popular heroes for their daring in fighting against heavy odds. The young nephew of Maurice Suckling, one of the captains present, who was in time to also embark on a naval career, was Horatio Nelson. Nelson considered the date of the battle a good omen, when 48 years to the day later, he faced a French fleet at the Battle of Trafalgar.

== Prelude ==
The British forces consisted of a detached squadron of three ships of the line under Commodore Arthur Forrest, that had been sent from Jamaica by Rear-Admiral Thomas Cotes to intercept a homeward-bound French convoy. The British squadron was made up of two 60-gun ships; HMS Augusta, flying Forrest's broad pennant, and HMS Dreadnought, under Captain Maurice Suckling. With them was the 64-gun HMS Edinburgh, under Captain William Langdon. The squadron arrived off Cap-Français in the morning of 21 October, expecting to find the convoy.

The French convoy's escort, under Guy François Coëtnempren de Kersaint had recently been reinforced, and by the time of the British arrival, consisted of four ships of the line and three large frigates. Possessing the superior force, Kersaint promptly put to sea as the British arrived, intent on catching the smaller force. Kersaint flew his flag aboard the 70-gun Intrépide, and was accompanied by the 70-gun Sceptre under Captain Clavel, the 64-gun Opiniatre under Captain Mollieu, the 50-gun Greenwich under Captain Foucault, the 44-gun frigate Outarde and the 32-gun frigates Sauvage and Licorne.

== Battle ==
Finding the French escort to be substantially larger than anticipated, and that it was manoeuvring to intercept them, Forrest called his captains together for a conference aboard his ship. The three captains met on the quarterdeck of Augusta, whereupon Forrest stated 'Well, gentlemen, you see that they have come out to engage us.' Suckling replied 'I think it would be a pity to disappoint them', to which Langdon agreed. Forrest then closed the discussion by saying 'very well, go onboard your ships again', which Langdon and Suckling proceeded to do, the conference having lasted just half a minute.

The British then formed up in line ahead, and notwithstanding the heavy French superiority, steered for them. Suckling in Dreadnought formed the van, with Forrest in Augusta in the centre, and Langdon in Edinburgh in the rear. The fighting began at 3.20 pm, and lasted for two and a half hours, until Kersaint signalled one of his frigates to tow his damaged flagship, Intrépide, out of the line. In doing so the French line fell into confusion, with Intrépide, Superbe and Greenwich falling aboard each other, and were heavily cannonaded by Augusta and Edinburgh until they were able to untangle themselves.

The other French ships gradually broke away from the action and moved off. The British were in no condition to follow, having suffered casualties of 23 killed and 89 wounded, with the ships having had their masts and rigging cut to pieces. Dreadnought had lost her main and mizzen topmasts, and unable to chase the French, the British squadron retired to Jamaica to carry out repairs. Kersaint, who had been wounded in the battle, returned to Cap-Français to carry out repairs, and then sailed for France with the convoy in November. The French casualties in the action were estimated at between 500 and 600 killed and wounded, with Opiniatre having been dismasted, while Greenwich had been left in a very leaky condition. Killed and wounded on the British ships amounted to the first lieutenant and eight men killed, and twenty-nine wounded on Augusta, nine killed and thirty wounded on Dreadnought, and five killed and thirty wounded on Edinburgh.

== Aftermath ==
The battle had been indecisive, with Kersaint able to conduct his convoy to France unmolested, once his ships had been repaired. Nonetheless, the British captains were praised for their courage and tenacity in engaging a superior force. Naval historian John Knox Laughton declared '...the credit of the action rested with Forrest and his companions, who had not hesitated to attack a very superior force, and had fought it without disadvantage.' Kersaint suffered a greater misfortune just off the French coast as he approached his destination, when he became caught in a storm, which caused Opiniatre, Greenwich and Outarde to run aground and be wrecked. The loss of the Greenwich on 1 January 1758 marked the end of a brief career for the French. Greenwich had been a former British ship, which had been captured by a French squadron under Commodore Joseph de Bauffremont on 18 March 1757, while sailing off Saint-Domingue under Captain Robert Roddam. Roddam had been chased for two days until being run down and captured by the 74-gun Diadème, and the 64-gun Éveillé.

The memory of the battle, and the perception of British heroism persisted during the 18th century. Maurice Suckling's nephew, Horatio Nelson knew of his uncle's exploits, and 48 years later to the day, on the morning of 21 October 1805, was heard to remark by HMS Victory's surgeon, William Beatty, 'that "the 21st of October was the happiest day in the year among his family"; but did not assign the reason of this. His Lordship had previously entertained a strong presentiment that this would prove the auspicious day, and had several times said to Captain Hardy and Doctor Scott ... "The 21st of October will be our day."' 21 October was the date of Nelson's victory, and death, at the Battle of Trafalgar.

== Order of battle ==
=== Britain ===
| Ship | Guns | Commander | Ref. |
|---|---|---|---|
| Augusta | 60 | Captain Arthur Forrest | |
| Dreadnought | 60 | Captain Maurice Suckling | |
| Edinburgh | 64 | Captain William Langdon | |

=== France ===
| Ship | Guns | Commander | Ref. |
|---|---|---|---|
| Intrépide | 74 | Captain Guy François Coëtnempren de Kersaint | |
| Sceptre | 74 | Captain Clavel | |
| Opiniâtre | 64 | Captain Mollieu | |
| Greenwich | 50 | Captain Foucault | |
| Outarde | 44 | | |
| Sauvage | 32 | Captain Antoine de Marges de Saint-Victoret | |
| Licorne | 32 | | |
