= Arthur Forrest (Royal Navy officer) =

Royal Navy officer and planter (1716–1770)

Captain Arthur Forrest
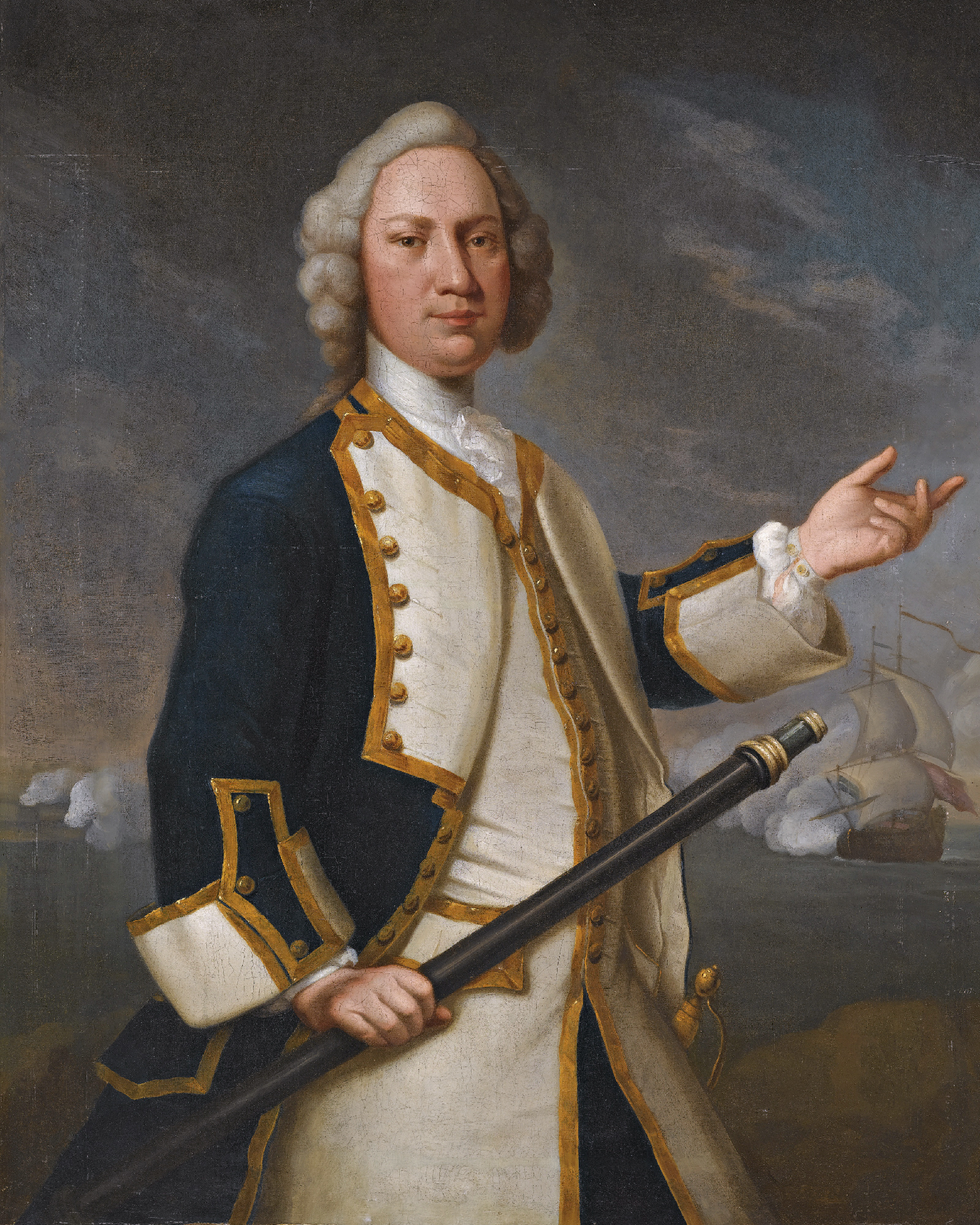
- Portrait attributed to Johan van Diest
- Born: c. 1716
- Died: 26 May 1770 (aged 53–54); Jamaica, British West Indies
- Military career
- Allegiance: Great Britain
- Branch: Royal Navy
- Service years: 1740–1770
- Rank: Captain
- Commands: HMS Alderney; HMS Hawk; HMS Success; HMS Wager; HMS Rye; HMS Augusta; HMS Centaur; Jamaica Station
- Conflicts: War of the Austrian Succession; Battle of Cartagena de Indias; Seven Years' War; Battle of Cap-Français

Captain Arthur Forrest (c. 1716 - 26 May 1770) was a Royal Navy officer and planter who saw service during the War of the Austrian Succession and the Seven Years' War, rising to the rank of post-captain. He also owned 3,000 acres of sugar plantations, and a considerable number of slaves, in the Colony of Jamaica.

== Early life ==
Details of Forrest's parents and upbringing are unknown, but he had served in the merchant navy as mate or master, trading with Cartagena. He volunteered to serve as a pilot, passed his lieutenant's examination by December 1740, and was given command of the sloop Pilot. During this time he was under orders to train officers in the pilotage of Port Royal. His skills led him to take a distinguished part in the Battle of Cartagena de Indias in March 1741. He came to the attention of Edward Boscawen after serving under him in an attack on the Baradera battery on shore on 17 and 18 March 1741, and on 25 May he was promoted by the expedition's commander, Admiral Edward Vernon, to command the bomb vessel HMS Alderney. Further appointments followed, to the sloop HMS Hawk in November 1742, and then to HMS Success. During this time he served on the home station and in convoy service to America.

In 1745 he was promoted to post captain and given command of HMS Wager, in which he took out a large convoy to Newfoundland. In November he was at Boston, where, by pressing some seamen contrary to colonial custom, he got into a troublesome dispute, ending in a serious fray, in which two men were killed. The boatswain of the Wager was arrested on a charge of murder, was convicted, and sentenced to death; the sentence, however, does not appear to have been carried out. Forrest afterwards went to the West Indies, where, in the following year, he captured a Spanish privateer of much superior force.

== Seven Years' War ==
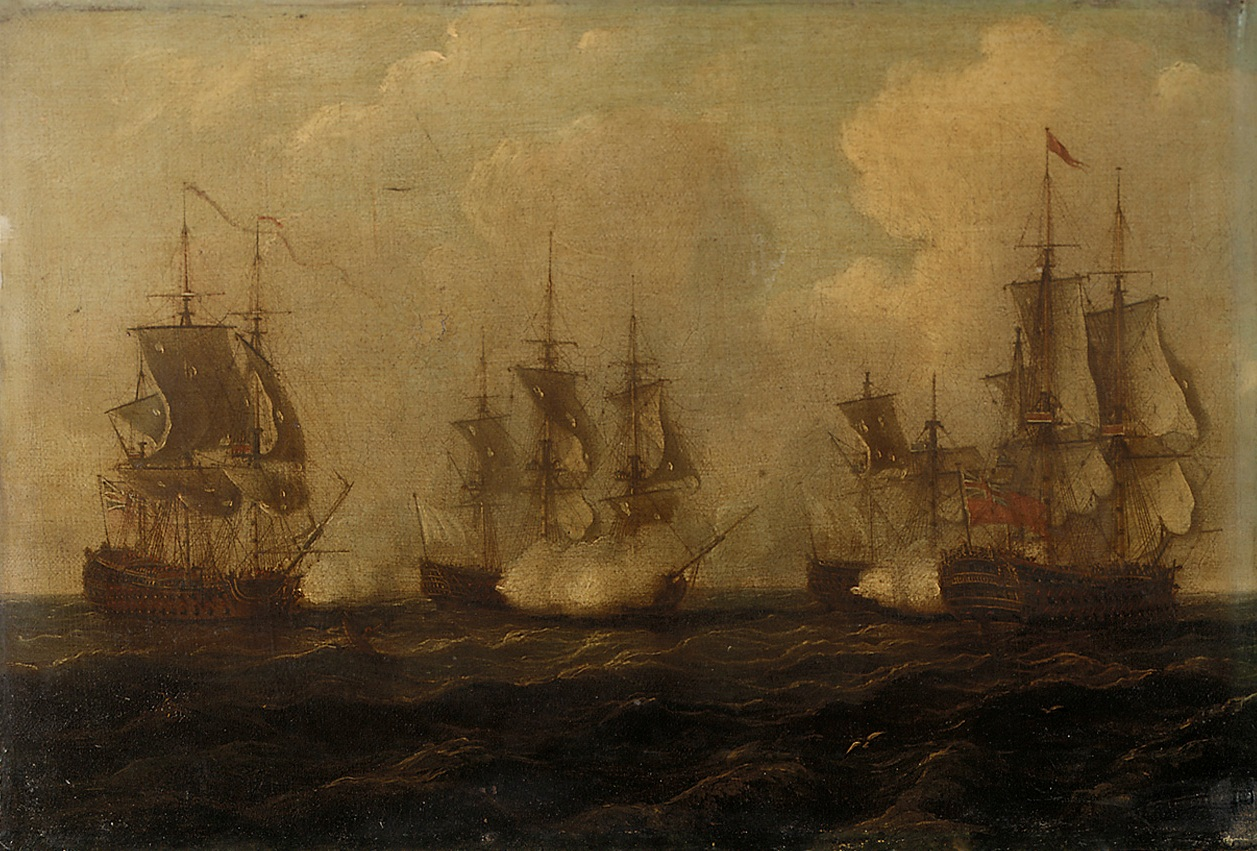
The Battle of Cap-Français, at which Forrest commanded HMS Augusta

In 1755 he commanded HMS Rye, in which he was again sent to the West Indies, and in 1757 was moved into the 60-gun HMS Augusta. In October he was detached, with HMS Dreadnought and Edinburgh under his command, to cruise off Cap-Français; and on 21 October he encountered a French squadron of four ships of the line and three heavy frigates under Guy François de Coetnempren, comte de Kersaint, which came out of harbour to drive the British away from a convoy. After a short conference with his colleagues, Captains Maurice Suckling and William Langdon said to have lasted just half a minute Forrest determined on attempting to carry out his orders, and bore down on the French squadron. In the ensuing battle the British managed to disable several French ships, but were outnumbered and too badly damaged to press an attack, and after two hours of fighting, each side drew off and returned to their respective ports. The French returned to the Cape, where they refitted and then proceeded on their voyage, while Forrest went back to Jamaica.

On 24 December, being detached singly off Petit-Goâve, he encountered a fleet of eight merchant ships, and in the night captured the sloop of war which was escorting them, and used her as a tender against her own convoy, taking all the ships. In August 1759 he took the Augusta to England, and on paying her off, in April 1760, commissioned HMS Centaur, one of the ships taken by Boscawen at the Battle of Lagos in 1759. After a few months with the fleet in the Bay of Biscay, he went out to the Jamaica Station, where, by the death of Rear-Admiral Charles Holmes in November 1761, he was left senior officer. On this he moved into HMS Cambridge, hoisted a broad pennant, and took on himself both the duties and privileges of commander-in-chief, until Sir James Douglas, coming from the Leeward Islands in April 1762, summarily dispossessed him. Forrest returned to England, passenger in a merchant ship, when, on reporting himself to the admiralty, he was told that his conduct in constituting himself commodore was 'most irregular and unjustifiable;’ and that the officers whom he had promoted would not be confirmed. This led to a long correspondence, in which the admiralty so far yielded as to order him to be reimbursed for the expenses he had incurred, though without sanctioning the higher rate of pay.

== Slave owner ==
In Jamaica, Forrest owned about 3,000 acres of land in Westmoreland Parish and Saint Elizabeth Parish. One of the many slaves on his estates, Apongo, whom Forrest named Wager after one of his ships, ended up being one of the most significant leaders of the Tacky's War slave revolt in western Jamaica.

Forrest purchased property in Jamaica following his appointment as Commander-in-Chief. He also probably inherited land in Jamaica and wealth from his father who died sometime before 1750. In Jamaica, Forrest owned at the time of his death six sugar estates: Masemure, Robins River, Ragged Castle, Vineyard and Pontrepant, Vineyard and Breadnut.

== Later life and death ==
In 1769, however, he was sent out to the same station as commander-in-chief, with his broad pennant in HMS Dunkirk. His time in the appointment was short-lived, he died at Jamaica on 26 May 1770. At the time of his death, he never knew that advice of his appointment to the rank of admiral and reputedly, elevation to the peerage as the Viscount Forrest, were on a ship from London to Jamaica.

Forrest owned 422 slaves at the time of probate, of whom 219 were listed as male and 203 as female. 117 were listed as boys, girls or children.

He had married Frederica Marina Cecilia, probably a daughter of Colonel Lynch of Jamaica, by whom he had two sons and five daughters. Mrs. Forrest survived her husband many years and died in 1802. His eldest daughter, Bridget, married the diarist John Byng, 5th Viscount Torrington. His third daughter, Cecilia, married William Windham.

== Notes ==
Military offices
Preceded by William Parry	Commander-in-Chief, Jamaica Station; 1769–1770	Succeeded by George Rodney
