= Roddam, Northumberland =

Village in Northumberland, England

Coordinates: 55.477252°N 1.9624936°W

Roddam
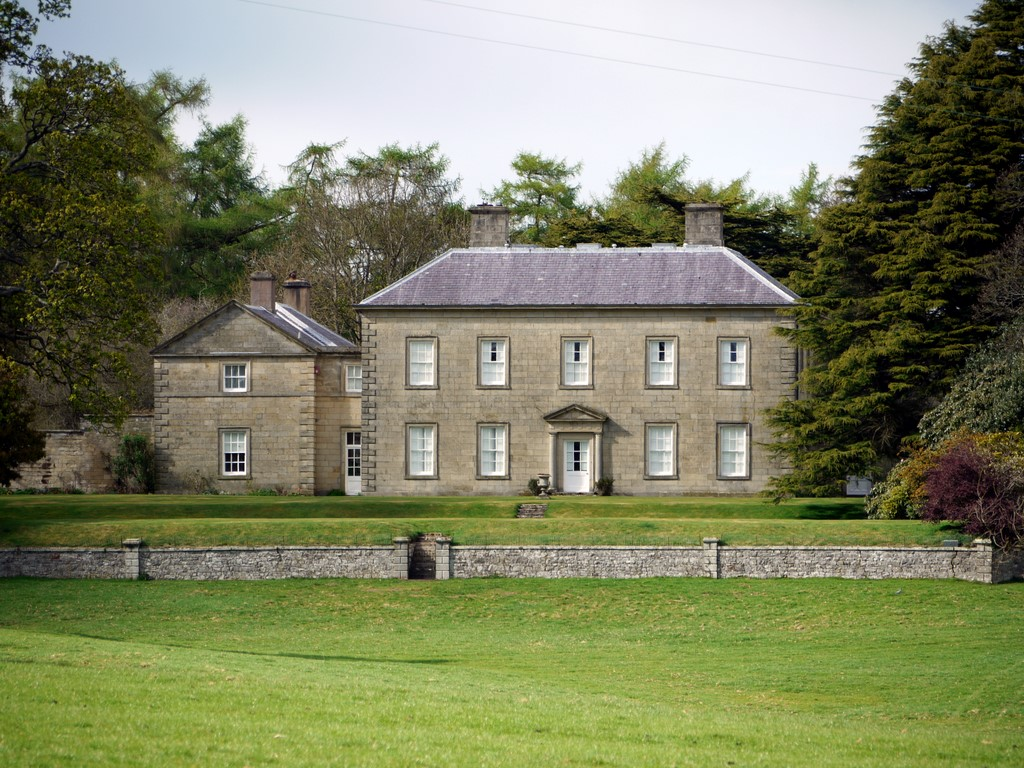
- Roddam Hall

- Location within Northumberland
- Area: 12.36 km^{2} (4.77 sq mi)
- Population: 77 (2001 census)
  - Density: 6/km^{2} (16/sq mi)
- OS grid reference: NU025204
- Civil parish: Roddam
- Unitary authority: Northumberland
- Ceremonial county: Northumberland
- Region: North East
- Country: England
- Sovereign state: United Kingdom
- Police: Northumbria
- Fire: Northumberland
- Ambulance: North East

Roddam is a village and civil parish about 24 miles from Morpeth, in the county of Northumberland, England. In 2001 the parish had a population of 77. The parish touches Bewick, Hedgeley, Ilderton, Ingram and Lilburn. It lies near the foot of the Cheviot Hills.

== Landmarks ==
There are 16 listed buildings in Roddam, including Roddam Hall.

== History ==
The name "Roddam" means 'At the clearings'. Roddam is a deserted medieval village, the village existed in 1296 but by the 19th century it had almost disappeared. Roddam was formerly a township in the parish of Ilderton, in 1866 Roddam became a civil parish in its own right. On 1 April 1955 Reaveley, Roseden and Wooperton parishes were merged with Roddam.
