= French ship Diadème (1756) =

Ship of the line of the French Navy

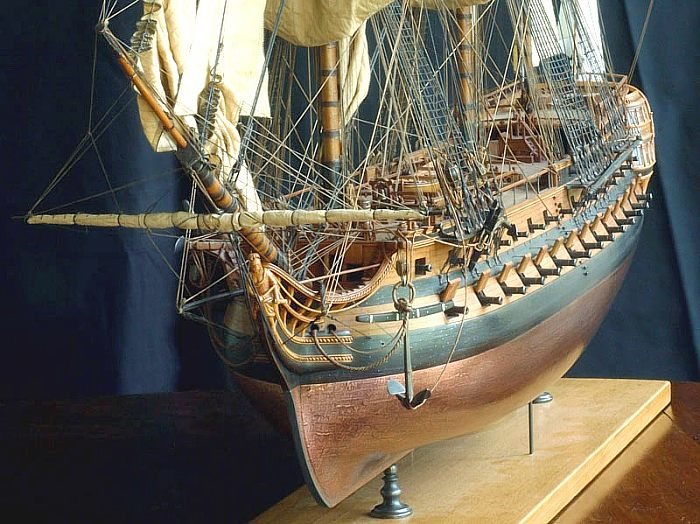
- A 74-gun French ship of the line similar to Diadème

History

France
- Name: Diadème
- Namesake: Diadem
- Ordered: 10 September 1755
- Builder: Brest
- Laid down: September 1755
- Launched: 26 July 1756
- Commissioned: November 1756
- Decommissioned: 1797
- Renamed: Brutus on 29 September 1792
- Fate: Broken up, 1797

General characteristics
- Class & type: Diadème-class ship of the line
- Displacement: 2800 tonneaux
- Tons burthen: 1500 port tonneaux
- Length: 54.6 m (179 ft 2 in)
- Beam: 14.1 m (46 ft 3 in)
- Draught: 6.8 m (22 ft 4 in)
- Propulsion: Sail
- Armament: 74 guns: 28 × 36-pounder long guns; 30 × 18-pounder long guns; 16 × 8-pounder long guns
- Armour: Timber

Diadème was the lead ship of the Diadème-class 74-gun ship of the line of the French Navy.

== Career ==
On 17 March 1757, along with the 64-gun Éveillé, she captured HMS Greenwich, commanded by Captain Robert Roddam, off Saint-Domingue. In 1761, she was under Breugnon.

In 1780, under Picot de Dampierre, she was part of La Motte-Piquet's division, along with Annibal, Amphion and Réfléchi.

She took part in the naval operations in the American Revolutionary War under de Grasse, notably fighting at the Battle of the Chesapeake under Louis Augustin de Monteclerc.

At the Battle of the Saintes on 12 April 1782 it was the gap between Diadème and the mastless Glorieux which allowed HMS Formidable to break the French line. She was severely damaged by Formidable and withdrew from the battle. on 25 April she was one of the ships ordered to rally at Cap Francois on San Domingo with de Vaudreuil's fleet.

On 29 September 1792, she was renamed Brutus.

She was razéed down to a 42-gun frigate in May 1794, and cruised off Groix under Captain Baud-Vachères. She took part in the Bataille du 13 prairial an 2 in June, taking the Indomptable in tow.

== Fate ==
Brutus was eventually broken up in 1797.
