= Thomas A. Bird =

British soldier and architect

Thomas Bird

Major Thomas Arthur Bird DSO, MC & Bar (11 August 1918 – 9 August 2017) was a distinguished British soldier and architect whose inspirational command of the anti-tank company (‘S’ Company) of 2nd Battalion, The Rifle Brigade, at Outpost Snipe during the Second Battle of El Alamein helped destroy the armoured counter-attack of General Erwin Rommel’s Afrika Korps. ‘When all seemed to be lost, there would be Dicky boy, calm and seemingly aloof from the dangers around us…’. The Daily Sketch described Snipe as ‘the finest action of the war’. He later became a noted architect working in collaboration with Richard Tyler (as Bird & Tyler Associates) from 1955 to 1985 in the neo-classical genre, having rejected an earlier flirtation with modernism.

He remains the only soldier to have witnessed two Victoria Cross actions, that of Second Lieutenant George Ward Gunn of 3rd Regiment Royal Horse Artillery (posthumously at Sidi Rezegh in 1941) and that of Colonel Victor Buller Turner, at Snipe.

Tom Bird died at his home in Turville Heath on 9 August 2017, two days before his 99th birthday.

== Early life ==
Bird was born on 11 August 1918, in Wargrave, Berkshire, United Kingdom. He was the younger son of Arthur and Evelyn Bird (née Huggins, a brewing family). Arthur Bird was a company director and country squire. Tom, as he was known, was brought up in the village of Fawley in Buckinghamshire, near Henley-on-Thames. Bird's paternal uncle was the cartoonist Cyril Kenneth Bird, better known as Fougasse, the art editor and later editor of Punch magazine in London. Bird's father contributed verse and doggerel (as AWB) to Punch before and during World War Two, always illustrated by Fougasse. His elder brother Edward was killed whilst serving in the 1st Battalion, The Rifle Brigade, at Calais on 25 May 1940, while trying to rescue wounded men trapped on a lorry whose driver had been shot.

== Education ==
Bird was educated at Winchester College (1931–35) where he excelled at drawing and cricket. He opened the batting for the school’s 1st XI in his last year. After Winchester, he attended the Architectural Association in London (1936–39 and 1946–47), his studies being interrupted by the Second World War.

== Military career ==
He joined the Supplementary Reserve of the 2nd Battalion, The Rifle Brigade (No.79884), in 1938 as a 2nd Lieutenant. In September 1939, while skiing in Switzerland he received a telegram from his regiment to return home as war had been declared by the Chamberlain government against Nazi Germany. On arriving at the Regimental depot in Winchester he was immediately posted to Palestine where the Arab Revolt was still smouldering.

His first action was against Italian forces, many of whom were poorly equipped. He was in the vanguard of Combeforce (led by Col John Combe of 11th Hussars) at the Battle of Beda Fomm, which dashed across 100 miles of desert to Sidi Saleh on the coast road (7 February 1941) and captured the Italian 10th Army of 20,000 (including 216 guns and 100 tanks) commanded by General Bergonzoli (‘Electric Whiskers’). General Richard O'Connor, commanding 7th Armoured Division called it ‘a complete victory as none of the enemy escaped.’ In early 1942 Rommel’s Afrika Korps turned the tide of battle; he had reached Sollum and was besieging Tobruk. Bird was part of 7th Support Group (in 7th Armoured Division) who were now organised in mobile harassing ‘Jock Columns’ (a troop of 25-pdrs, a motorised infantry company, anti-tank guns, engineers), devised to cover vast acres of no-man’s land by Maj-Gen ‘Jock’ Campbell VC, who commanded the Support Group. As the Rifle Brigade history notes of ‘Jock Columns’; ‘they learnt to penetrate areas dominated by the enemy…to make deadly and damaging thrusts…against his supply lines.’ Bird carried out numerous night patrols.

Most company commanders sent junior officers on patrols but Bird went himself. On one he won a Military Cross. During the battle for Sidi Rezegh (November 21–23, 1941), fought to relieve Tobruk, Bird was hit in the ankle. When he recovered, Bird was made commander of ‘S’ [Support] company of 2nd Battalion, The Rifle Brigade (2RB), now equipped with 16 of its own ‘pretty useless’ 2 pounders (‘but better than nothing’), the first time a motor battalion had its own anti-tank guns – 2RB previously had to rely on 3 rd Royal Horse Artillery’s guns. In July 1942 his company was equipped with the new (‘excellent’) 6 pdr anti-tank gun and first used it at the Free French desert citadel (or ‘box’) of Bir Hakeim, which anchored the southern end of the British line, held by about 3700 of General Koenig’s 1st Free French Brigade (mostly very tough Légionnaires). When Rommel advanced eastwards to try and take Tobruk, Bir Hakeim was in the way. The French fought furiously against constant artillery bombardment and incessant Stuka attacks.

Rommel’s hand-written note to Koenig to surrender or ‘face destruction’ was answered by a cannon salvo which destroyed some German trucks. Their stubborn bravery established the Free French as a fighting force, and caused Rommel considerable logistical problems. But they became desperately short of ammunition, and Koenig’s resolve seemed to waver.

On the night of June 7/8 Bird brought in a column of 25 Royal Army Service Corps ammunition trucks with an RB escort through German lines and minefields, a hazardous operation in the dark. He went in from the west, the enemy side, gambling that the Germans would assume the column was their own transport. It worked, he only lost one truck.

He had with him two 6 pounders, in case he met trouble on the way in. The Légionnaires were delighted to see these new weapons, and in Bir Hakeim gleefully pointed out targets ‘even though this brought down fire…’ Bird went to see Koenig in his dugout, who grudgingly thanked him for the supplies but said it wasn’t enough and he was going to surrender anyway. Horrified, Bird asked that this be delayed until he could extricate his relief column that night. Koenig agreed. In the event Koenig, his English driver (and mistress) Susan Travers and about 2,500 Free French did not surrender, but fought their way out on 10/11 June, the additional ammunition allowing time to plan the break-out. In 2004 Bird received thanks for his support for the beleaguered garrison when he was awarded the Légion d’honneur.

Rommel continued his advance until stopped at El Alamein (just 66 miles from Alexandria), a railway halt. During the precipitate retreat across the Egyptian frontier and beyond, Bird and 2RB of 7th Motor Brigade had ranged far behind the German lines, alone, unsupported, at great distances from the rest of the Army, always on the move, destroying tanks and guns and transport – and delaying Rommel’s pursuit.

Bird had even at one point captured a German 88mm anti-tank gun. On July 2 the withdrawal stopped. Bird’s unit had been ‘among the first to meet the enemy on the 26th of May, had been the last to withdraw, the last through the wire, and, 'in a collection of vehicles which would have disgraced a circus, were the last to reach Alamein,’ as the Regimental history records.

Rommel tried twice more to break through. The First Battle of El Alamein (July 1–27, 1942) ended in stalemate after a series of thrusts and counter-attacks by both sides, British attacks being hampered by poor infantry/armour co-ordination. On July 4, the same day as his Colonel, Hugo Garmoyle, was killed, Bird was wounded again. He had heard a battle on his flank and sped off with his driver to see whether his guns might take the enemy in flank. He was peering through his field glasses when a shell burst overhead and shrapnel penetrated his shoulder and his driver’s wrist, which started pumping blood. Bird drove his Jeep with one hand while the other sought to stem his driver’s loss of blood. He found a first-aid post but refused, after being patched up, to go back for further treatment himself.

== Gallantry medals and citations ==
Bird was awarded the Distinguished Service Order and a Military Cross and Bar. These are currently held by the Royal Green Jackets (Rifles) Museum in Winchester.

=== Military Cross: Tobruk January 1941 ===
Bird was ordered to test Tobruk’s western defences at Ras el Medauuar. He repeatedly drove his carriers up to the wire and minefields (at one point driving over a mine that failed to explode), firing all his Brens, supported by 4 RHA’s 25-pounders. In return they were met by ‘very heavy defensive fire’ as the citation stated. The citation continued: ‘Working his carrier around the flank, he completely surrounded the strong enemy position, protected by mines and booby traps, and forced it to surrender.’ The citation praised his ‘conspicuous gallantry and leadership’, ‘skill and coolness’. Some 2,000 Italians were captured.

=== Bar to MC: Ban Gebel Kalakh July 1942 ===
Bird’s brigadier (‘who had clearly never been on a patrol himself’) told him to lay on a strong night patrol to penetrate the enemy opposite (‘in depth’) to find out their strength. ‘The more I thought about it the less I liked it – how were we going to extricate ourselves?’ Bird ‘interpreted’ the orders and made a raid on the nearest outpost (‘across 2,700 yards of open ground in brilliant moonlight’, as the citation states), to ‘see what we could capture’, arranging for 4th RHA to shell it while his own Brens gave covering fire from a flank. ‘It all had to be nicely timed so that the shelling and covering fire only stopped when we were very close to the outpost. All went well…’ The citation continues: ‘100 yards short of the objective a wire fence was encountered, which he negotiated under intense fire, and then took his patrol in with great gallantry and determination, overrunning three posts and capturing two officers and fifteen other ranks. In spite of heavy small-arms and mortar fire he withdrew his patrol without casualties. The success of this patrol was almost entirely due to the careful preparation and courageous leadership of its commander, to his unwavering determination to attack and capture a heavily defended position…’

=== Distinguished Service Order: El Alamein (Snipe) October 1942 ===
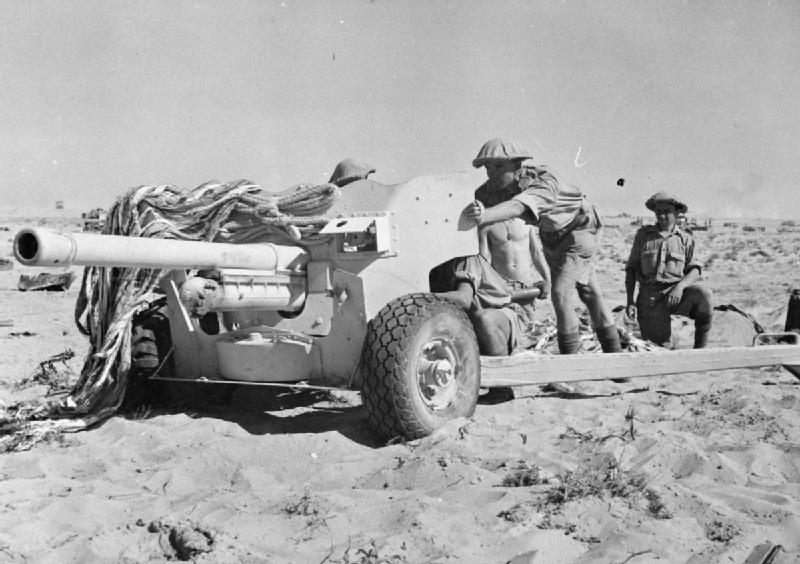
A 6-pounder anti-tank gun of the type used in the Snipe action, photographed in the Western Desert on 29 October 1942 (E18802)

Extract from the citation; ‘Major BIRD, with his courage and leadership, was an inspiration to all ranks.. [he] paid no heed to his own safety [and] was always at the critical point performing many duties, directing the fire of a gun whose No. 1 was wounded, loading another…fetching ammunition and cheering his men. All this he did under intense fire’.

The Snipe action destroyed at least 33 tanks and 5 self-propelled guns, and blunted Rommel’s armoured counter-thrust.

Rifleman R L Crimp, who later published his diary, witnessed Bird’s action at around 11.30 am;

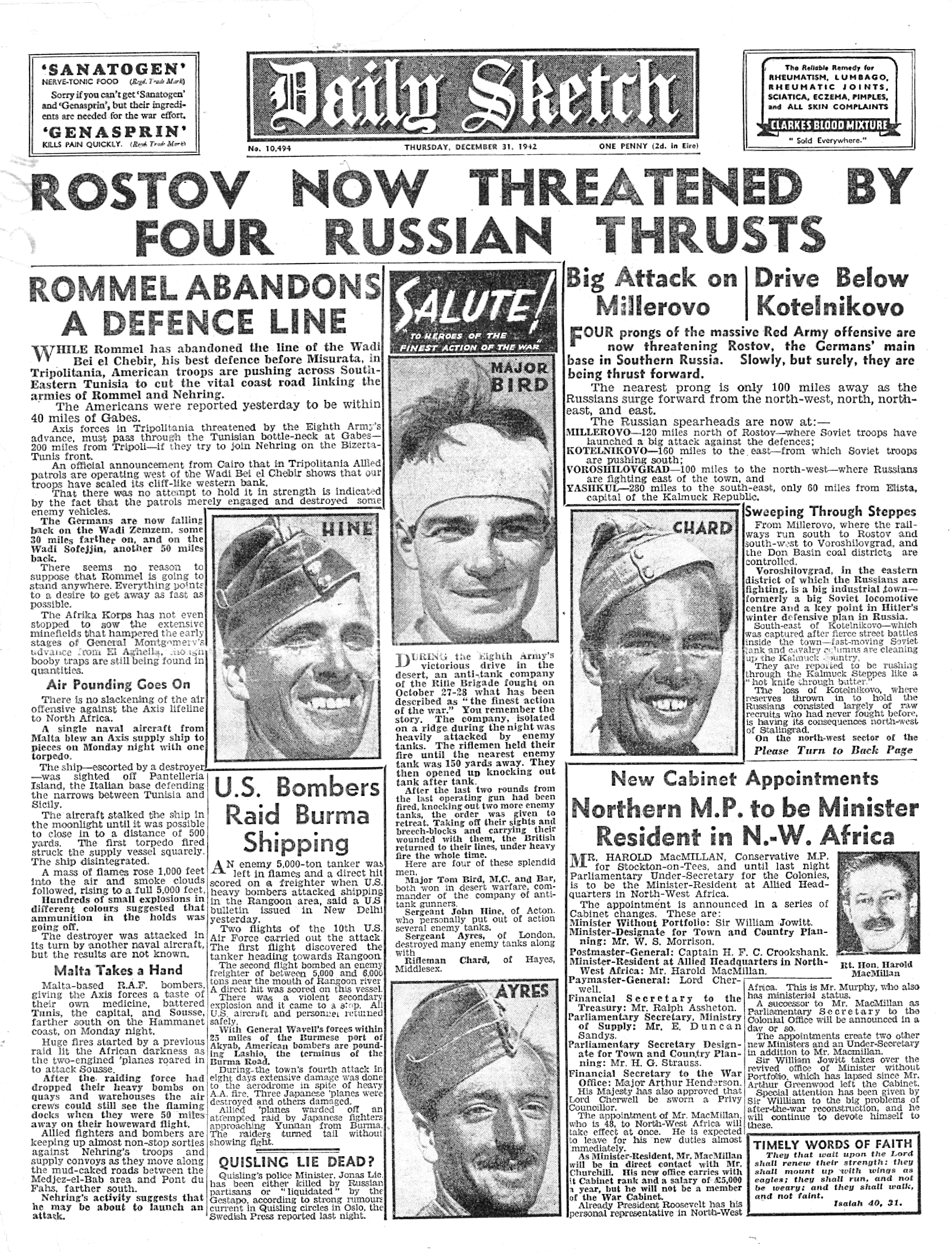
Front page of the Daily Sketch from 31 December 1942

‘Several guns are now completely out of ammo. The situation’s so bad that two officers of ‘S’ Company [Bird and one of his platoon commanders, Lt Jack Toms] try to effect a re-distribution of what remains by jeep. They travel slowly over the dunes (four-wheeled drive carrying them on), quite heedless of the M/G bullets slashing the air around them and panzers potting straight at them, collecting odd rounds from knocked-out guns or the guns of knocked-out crews, and taking them to guns that can still strike back. One bullet amongst the ammo on board and the lot would go sky-high.’

== ADC to Wavell in India ==
After recovering from his wounds at Snipe, he was asked by Field Marshal Archibald Wavell, then Commander-in-Chief India, to be his ADC and Comptroller. Bird was a fellow Wykehamist, had been at Winchester with Archie John, Wavell’s son, and had often been invited to dine with the Wavells in Cairo when ‘The Chief’ (as Wavell was known) was Commander-in-Chief Middle East – rather to the envy of his brother officers. In a letter of 24 February 1943 Wavell wrote to Gen O’Connor (then a POW in Italy) that he had a new ADC ‘who was with my boy at Winchester; his name is Bird and he has been wounded three times and has got a DSO and two Military Crosses so he deserves a bit of a rest from the desert.’

On Wavell being asked to replace Lord Linlithgow as Viceroy in June 1943, Bird returned to his battalion – briefly acting as ADC to General Auchinleck (when he

replaced Wavell as C-in-C India) and as ADC to General Sir Henry (‘Jumbo’) Wilson (then C-in-C Middle East Command) for the Cairo Conference (Sextant - November 22–26), where he met Roosevelt, Churchill and Chiang Kai-shek, and learnt the date of D-Day.

== Arnhem ==
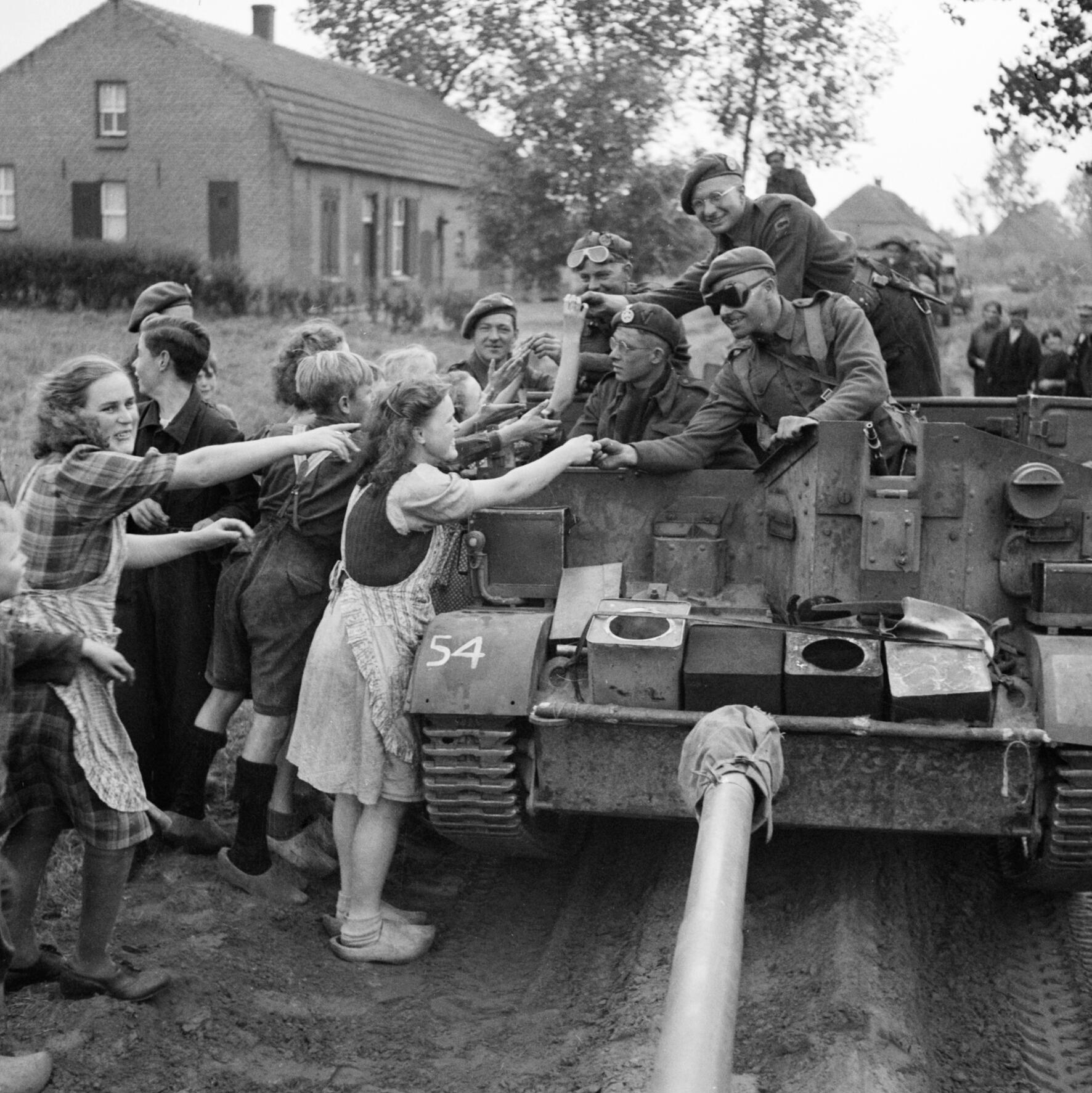
A carrier crew of 8th Rifle Brigade hands out chocolate to Dutch civilians during the advance of 11th Armoured Division in Holland, 22 September 1944

After a 6-month spell back in England as an instructor at the School of Infantry at Barnard Castle, Co Durham (from January 1944) Bird joined 8th Rifle Brigade in their push towards Arnhem to relieve the Paras of the 6th Airborne Division at Arnhem Bridge, but was seriously wounded by mortar fire on September 23. His fighting war was over.

== ADC in Washington ==
Upon release from hospital he accepted the post of ADC to Field Marshal Wilson in Washington who had replaced Field Marshal Sir John Dill as Chief of the British Joint Mission. There he stayed throughout 1945, joining Wilson in Germany for the Potsdam Conference where they were General Eisenhower’s guests. While dining with Ike the news arrived of the successful testing of an atom bomb. Perversely perhaps, Bird had been privy to its secret while Vice President Truman had not.

Bird was demobbed in December 1945 and returned to London and his architectural studies.

== Architectural practice ==
Back in London Bird returned to his architectural studies at the AA. He was trained in the Modern ethos. He received his diploma in 1948 and joined the leading Modern practice in London of Maxwell Fry and Jane Drew. But he rejected the Modernist dogma and set up on his own in 1952, with Fry providing work. In 1955 Bird entered into partnership with Richard Tyler, whom he’d met in the Western Desert, where Tyler had lost a leg. Bird and Tyler, until their retirement in 1985, designed, restored and remodelled numerous country houses all over Britain. They seldom collaborated, but provided constructive criticism of each other’s projects. Bird specialised in reconstructions or, occasionally, entirely new country houses (for example Gredington Park in Shropshire for Lord Kenyon, 1982). His clients were mostly traditional landowners. His work is distinguished by restraint and sensitivity, as at Sansaw, Shropshire (for Robin Bibby Thompson), where careful remodelling maintained the old appearance of a 19th Century Queen Anne Revival original; and Roddam Hall in Northumberland (for Lord Vinson) where he took off the top storey and dramatically remodelled the interior. One of his more modest houses was misidentified by Pevsner as ‘good Georgian.’ Among his best known work is Hall Barn (1972), Buckinghamshire (for Lord Burnham), where 19th century additions had unbalanced the late 17th century design and made it too big. Perhaps his major country house, and a foray into the grandiose, is Lushhill in Wiltshire (1966), built for Captain Fred Barker in Regency style, for whom he had already designed a stud farm. One architectural historian praised the ‘amazing achievement’ of its elevations, its ‘lavish interior’ and ‘spectacular oval staircase hall’.

== Personal life ==
Tom Bird was married in March 1945 in Boston, Massachusetts, USA to Alice Maclaurin Hunsaker, youngest daughter of noted aeronautical pioneer Professor Jerome C.Hunsaker of MIT, who was Chairman of the US National Advisory Committee for Aeronautics (later NASA). He led the team that designed the first plane to cross the Atlantic, the NC (Navy Curtis) 4. Alice Bird died on 22 October 2015 in Henley-on-Thames, Oxfordshire, UK. They had three children; two sons, Antony and Nicholas (who run Bird Battlefield Tours); one daughter, Sarah.

Bird collected modern paintings, including works by John Piper, Fred Uhlman, Anthony Gross and Felix Kelly. He was High Sheriff of Buckinghamshire from 1989 to 1990. Bird was also a fine sportsman, playing cricket for Berkshire, I Zingari, Butterflies, Free Foresters and Henley, for whom he once played against an MCC team (brought by ‘Plum’ Warner) which included both Dennis and Leslie Compton. Bird was a proficient Alpine skier and climber, a good tennis player and fisherman, and an excellent shot, only retiring in his mid-eighties. In 1960 he bought a mainly mid-19th century house remodelled for the Duchess of Bedford by CE Kempe, Chenies Place in Buckinghamshire. The 12-acre gardens were laid out by Edwin Lutyens and Gertrude Jekyll, which Bird and his wife restored.

== Articles and media ==
Bird was amused when asked by Italian TV to correct a fanciful impression that Italian troops were prone to surrender. He said, truthfully, that their armoured units in their vulnerable tanks were very brave indeed. Bird appeared in many articles and books, including a Financial Times profile entitled ‘The Modest Face of Heroism’ (1992), and a novel in which he is the hero (‘Killing had become second nature to Bird…’). An article in Country Life devoted to Bird’s country houses, described Bird’s neo-classical architecture as ‘self-effacing’, and ‘dignified and well-proportioned’. Bird retired in 1985 ‘when bricks went metric’ as he put it, although he did the occasional design for a friend, like the millennium folly he built for Sir Alistair Horne in Turville, Buckinghamshire, and he never stopped drawing and sketching.

Tom Bird died at his home in Turville Heath on August 9, 2017.
