= Diadème-class ship of the line =

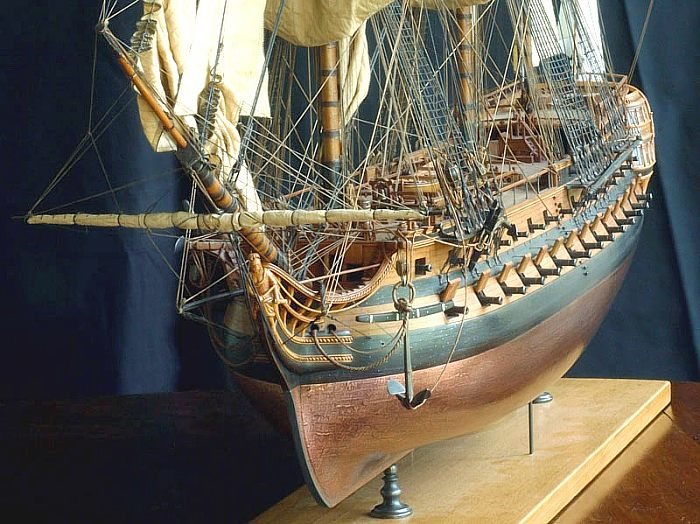
A 74-gun French ship of the line similar to Diadème-class ships of the line

The Diadème class was a type of 74-gun ship of the line of the French Navy.
