= Roddam Hall =

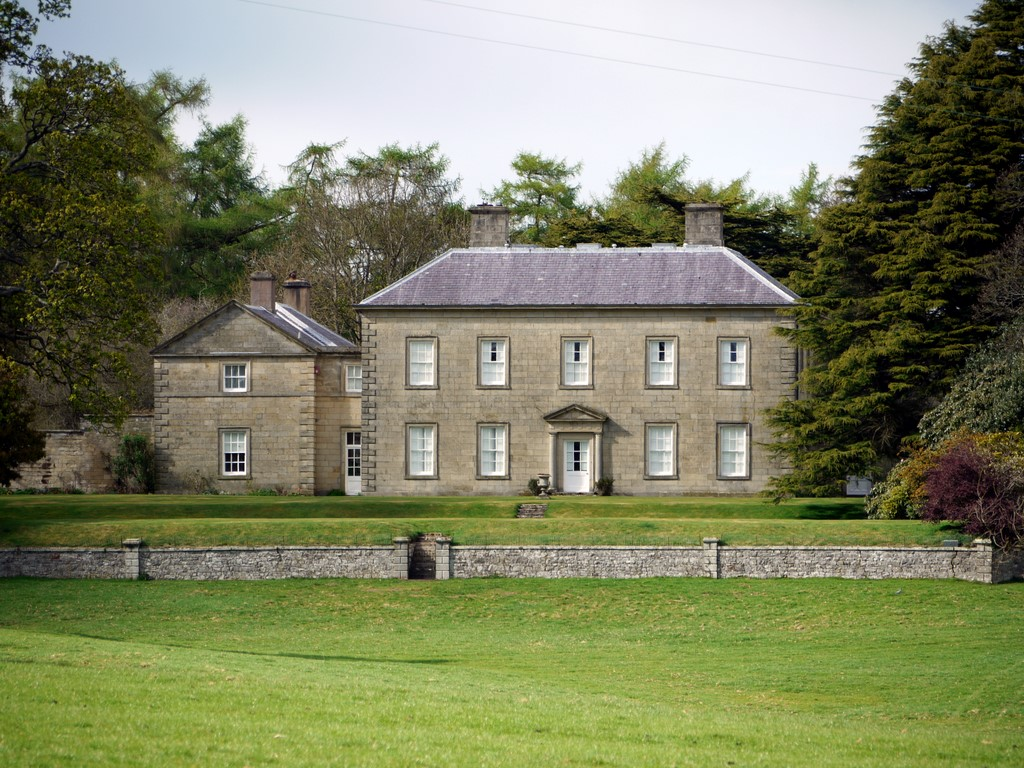

- Location in Northumberland

General information
- Location: Northumberland, England
- Coordinates: 55.478°N 1.961°W
- OS grid: NU025204

Roddam Hall is a privately owned 18th-century country house near Wooler, Northumberland. It is a Grade II listed building.

The Roddams, an ancient Northumbrian family, held lands at Roddam in ancient times. A survey of 1541 reported a decaying tower house without a barmkin owned by John Roddam. The Roddams lived at Houghton in Northumberland until the early 18th century, when Edward Roddam sold the Houghton estate and built a new three-storey five-bayed house at Roddam.

From 1776 the house was owned by Admiral Robert Roddam. He was a brother-in-law of General Sir Henry Clinton (1730–1795). On his death the estate passed to a distant cousin, William Spencer Stanhope, who changed his name to Roddam. He was High Sheriff of Northumberland in 1834. In 1848, the house was desecribed as "a handsome modern mansion, standing on a bold eminence which on the north forms the bank of a deep romantic dell watered by a tributary of the Till."

Roddam was remodelled in the early 1970s by the noted neo-classical architect Tom Bird (of Bird & Tyler Associates). Bird took off the top storey (a late, unattractive addition to the Georgian original) and dramatically reworked the interior.

In 2012 Roddam Hall was sold by Lord Vinson to Lord James Percy, younger brother of the Duke of Northumberland.
