= HMS Warspite (1666) =

Ship, 1666

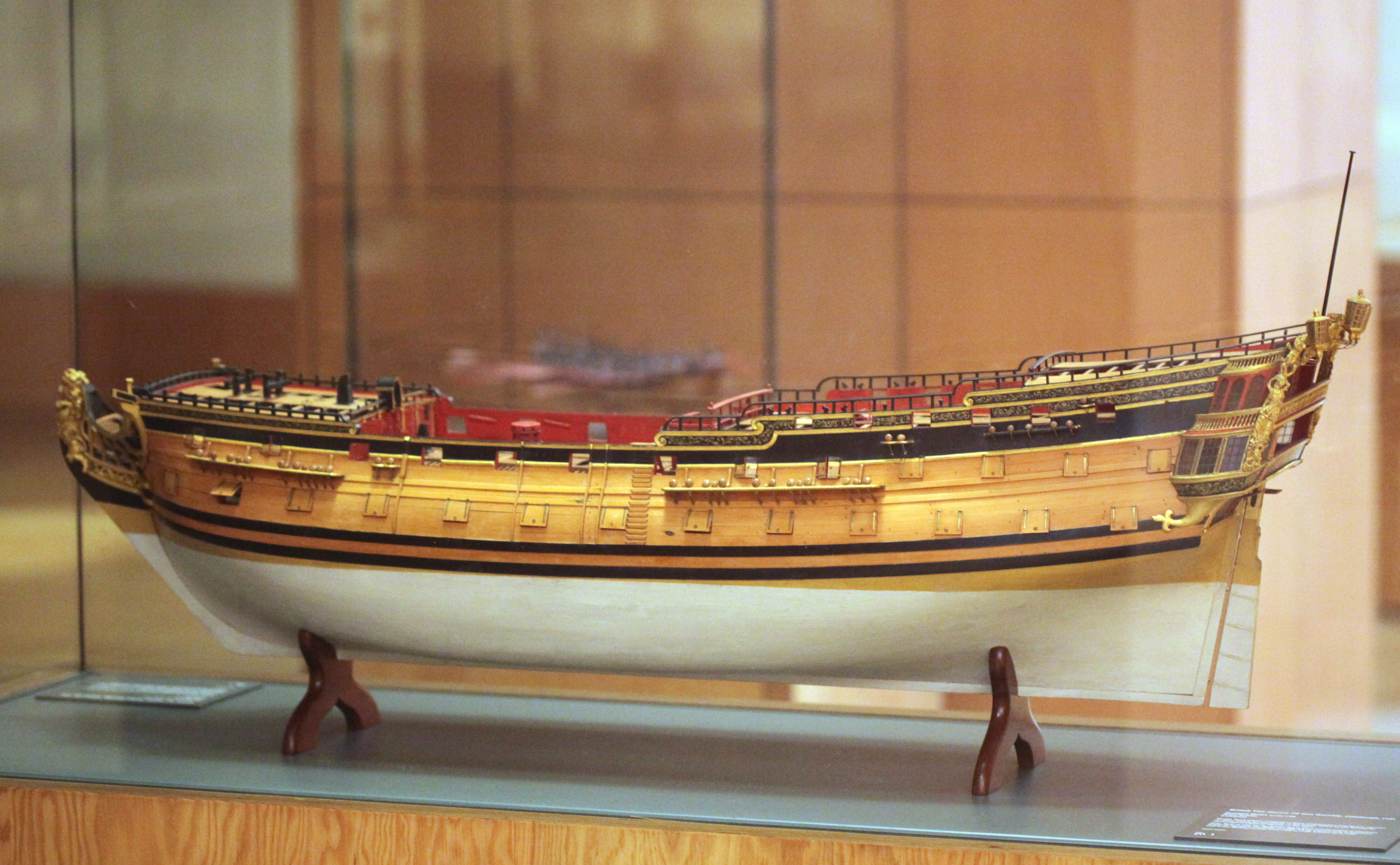
- Model of HMS Edinburgh of 1721 in the Thomson Collection of Ship Models on display at the Art Gallery of Ontario

History

Great Britain
- Name: HMS Warspite
- Builder: Johnson, Blackwall Yard
- Launched: 1666
- Renamed: HMS Edinburgh, 1721
- Honours and awards: Second Battle of Cape Finisterre, 1747
- Fate: Broken up, 1771

General characteristics as built
- Class & type: 70-gun third-rate ship of the line
- Tons burthen: 885 bm
- Length: 117 ft (36 m) (keel)
- Beam: 38 ft 9 in (11.81 m)
- Depth of hold: 15 ft 4 in (4.67 m)
- Sail plan: Full-rigged ship
- Armament: 70 guns of various weights of shot

General characteristics after 1702 rebuild
- Class & type: 66-gun third-rate ship of the line
- Tons burthen: 952 bm
- Length: 147 ft 7 in (44.98 m) (gundeck)
- Beam: 38 ft 6.5 in (11.748 m)
- Depth of hold: 15 ft 8 in (4.78 m)
- Sail plan: Full-rigged ship
- Armament: 66 guns of various weights of shot

General characteristics after 1721 rebuild
- Class & type: 1719 Establishment 70-gun third-rate ship of the line
- Tons burthen: 1119 bm
- Length: 151 ft (46 m) (gundeck)
- Beam: 41 ft 6 in (12.65 m)
- Depth of hold: 17 ft 4 in (5.28 m)
- Sail plan: Full-rigged ship
- Armament: 70 guns: Gundeck: 26 × 24 pdrs; Upper gundeck: 26 × 12 pdrs; Quarterdeck: 14 × 6 pdrs; Forecastle: 4 × 6 pdrs

General characteristics after 1744 rebuild
- Class & type: 1741 proposals 64-gun third-rate ship of the line
- Tons burthen: 1285 bm
- Length: 154 ft (47 m) (gundeck)
- Beam: 44 ft (13 m)
- Depth of hold: 18 ft 11 in (5.77 m)
- Sail plan: Full-rigged ship
- Armament: 64 guns: Gundeck: 26 × 32 pdrs; Upper gundeck: 26 × 18 pdrs; Quarterdeck: 10 × 9 pdrs; Forecastle: 2 × 9 pdrs

HMS Warspite was a 70-gun third-rate ship of the line of the Royal Navy, launched in 1666 at Blackwall Yard. This second Warspite was one of the five ships designed to carry more provisions and lower deck guns higher above the water than French and Dutch equivalents. In 1665 the Second Anglo-Dutch War had begun and on 25 July 1666 Warspite was one of 23 new English warships helping to beat a Dutch fleet off North Foreland, Kent. She won again distinction on Christmas Day 1666 as senior officer's ship out of five sent to protect an important convoy of naval stores from the Baltic. Warspite next took part in the first action of the Third Anglo-Dutch War on 28 May 1672 off Southwold Bay, Suffolk. This desperate 14-hour battle, generally known as Solebay, was a drawn fight; but Warspite successfully fended off a pair of Dutch fire ships exactly as she had done off North Foreland. By 1685, she was mounting only 68 guns.

On 15 September 1689 Warspite was recommissioned shortly after the outbreak of the War of the English Succession. She took part in a battle lost against a larger French fleet off Beachy Head, Sussex, on 30 June 1690. And landed men in Ireland to help at the Siege of Cork. In 1702 Warspite was rebuilt at Rotherhithe on the Thames and emerged as a 66-gun ship of 952 tons. In July 1704 she was present at Sir George Rooke's capture of Gibraltar, and suffered 60 casualties in the Battle of Malaga (24 August) which defeated the French attempt to recover the fortress. She continued to serve in the Mediterranean until 1709, when she joined the Channel Fleet. In August 1712, Warspite was paid off at Woolwich.

== Renamed HMS Edinburgh ==
On 30 June 1721 she was rebuilt for a second time at Chatham, relaunching as a 70-gun ship to the 1719 Establishment and renamed HMS Edinburgh. On 14 May 1741 orders were issued for Edinburgh to be taken to pieces for her third and final rebuild, this time at Chatham Dockyard according to the 1741 proposals of the 1719 Establishment as a 64-gun ship. She was relaunched on 31 May 1744.

In 1771 Edinburgh was broken up.
