= Guy François Coëtnempren de Kersaint =

- Born: 7 June 1703; Plounéventer, Province of Brittany, France
- Died: 20 November 1759 (aged 56)
- Relatives: Guy-Pierre de Kersaint; Armand de Kersaint
- Military career
- Branch: French Navy
- Rank: captain
- Conflicts: Seven Years' War; Battle of Cap-Français; Battle of Quiberon Bay

Captain Guy François Coëtnempren de Kersaint (7 June 1703 – 20 November 1759) was a French Navy officer who served in the Seven Years' War.

== Biography ==
Kersaint joined the French Navy as a Garde-Marine in February 1722, and was promoted to ensign in October 1731, lieutenant in May 1741, and captain in January 1747.

In 1756, he took command of the 74-gun Intrépide. He led a squadron to cruise off Guinea, destroying British factories and engaging in commerce raiding. He then sailed to the Caribbean. On 21 October 1757, near Caicos, his squadron encountered three British ships of the line, leading to the Battle of Cap-Français. Kersaint was wounded and Intrépide was almost completely dismasted, and the French retreated to Cap-Français after heavy fighting.

In 1759, he took command of Thésée. He took part in the Battle of Quiberon Bay on 20 November 1759. During the battle, as Kersaint was attempting to come to the aid of Hubert de Brienne, Comte de Conflans, Thésée performed a turn without closing her lower gunports. Water rushed into the gundeck, and Thésée capsized, killing most aboard.

== Sources and references ==
Notes

Bibliography

- Taillemite, Étienne (2002). Dictionnaire des Marins français. Tallandier. ISBN 2-84734-008-4. OCLC 606770323.
