= List of ship launches in 1747 =

The list of ship launches in 1747 includes a chronological list of some ships launched in 1747.

| Date | Ship | Class | Builder | Location | Country | Notes |
|---|---|---|---|---|---|---|
| 21 January | Queenborough | Sixth rate | Earlsman Sparrow | Rotherhithe | Great Britain | For Royal Navy. |
| 4 February | Perr-i Bahri | Fifth rate | | Constantinople | Ottoman Empire | For Ottoman Navy. |
| 12 February | Content | Third rate | Joseph Veronique Charles Chapelle | Toulon | Kingdom of France | For French Navy. |
| 23 February | San Carlo Borromeo | San Carlo Borromeo-class ship of the line | | Venice | Republic of Venice | For Venetian Navy. |
| 19 March | Greenwich | Fourth rate | Moody Janvrin | Lepe | Great Britain | For Royal Navy. |
| 24 March | Intrépide | Sceptre-class ship of the line | Jacques-Luc Coulomb | Brest | Kingdom of France | For French Navy. |
| March | Fougueux | Third rate | Jacques-Luc Coulomb | Brest | Kingdom of France | For French Navy. |
| March | Monarque | Sceptre-class ship of the line | Jacques-Luc Coulomb | Brest | France | For French Navy. |
| 15 April | Thetis | Fifth rate | John Okill | Liverpool | Great Britain | For Royal Navy. |
| 30 May | Rainbow | Fifth rate | Robert Carter | Limehouse | Great Britain | For Royal Navy. |
| 10 July | Severn | Fourth rate | John Barnard | Harwich | Great Britain | For Royal Navy. |
| 11 July | Expedition | Fifth rate | John Okill | Liverpool | Great Britain | For Royal Navy. |
| 12 July | Prince Henry | Fifth rate | John Gorill | Liverpool | Kingdom of Great Britain | For Royal Navy. |
| 13 July | Crown | Fifth rate | James Taylor | Rotherhithe | Great Britain | For Royal Navy. |
| 4 August | Triton | Ship of the line | | Toulon | France | For French Navy. |
| 26 August | Tavistock | Fourth rate | Hugh Blaydes | Hull | Great Britain | For Royal Navy. |
| 9 September | Culloden | Third rate | | Deptford Dockyard | Great Britain | For Royal Navy. |
| 16 September | Dragon | Third rate | Jacques-Luc Coulomb | Brest | Kingdom of France | For French Navy. |
| 26 September | Assurance | Fifth rate | Richard Heather | Bursledon | Great Britain | For Royal Navy. |
| September | Junon | Fifth rate | | Havre de Grâce | Kingdom of France | For French Navy. |
| 10 October | Anson | Fourth rate | Ewer | Bursledon | Great Britain | For Royal Navy. |
| 7 November | Penzance | Fifth rate | Vernon Chitty | Chichester | Great Britain | For Royal Navy. |
| 15 November | Achille | Third rate | Claude Louis Coulomb | Toulon | Kingdom of France | For French Navy. |
| 23 November | Tiger | Fourth rate | Stanton & Wells | Rotherhithe | Great Britain | For Royal Navy. |
| 22 December | Assistance | Fourth rate | Ledger | River Medway | Great Britain | For Royal Navy. |
| 23 December | St Albans | Fourth rate | Thomas West | Deptford Dockyard | Great Britain | For Royal Navy. |
| Unknown date | Chesterfield | East Indiaman | | London | Great Britain | For British East India Company. |
| Unknown date | Delaware | East Indiaman | | | Great Britain | For British East India Company. |
| Unknown date | Duke of Dorset | East Indiaman | | London | Great Britain | For British East India Company. |
| Unknown date | Edgecote | East Indiaman | | London | Great Britain | For British East India Company. |
| Unknown date | Eendracht | Third rate | Charles Bentam | Amsterdam | Dutch Republic | For Dutch Navy. |
| Unknown date | La Dryade | Gabarre | | Lorient | Kingdom of France | For Compagnie des Indes. |
| Unknown date | Favorite | Fifth rate | Pierre Chaillé Fils | Havre de Grâce | Kingdom of France | For French Navy. |
| Unknown date | Friponne | Sixth rate | | Rochefort | Kingdom of France | For French Navy. |
| Unknown date | Amarante | Palme-class corvette | Blaise Joseph Ollivier | Brest | Kingdom of France | For French Navy. |
| Unknown date | Anémone | Palme-class corvette | Blaise Joseph Ollivier | Brest | Kingdom of France | For French Navy. |
| Unknown date | Sceptre | Third rate | Jacques-Luc Coulomb | Brest | Kingdom of France | For French Navy. |
| Unknown date | Shaw Pedro | Grab | | Bombay | India | For private owner. |
| Unknown date | Tigre | Third rate | | | Spain | For Spanish Navy. |
| Unknown date | Welvaaren van het Land | Sixth rate | Paulus van Zwijndrecht | Rotterdam | Dutch Republic | For Dutch Navy. |
| Unknown date | Zuid Beveland | Third rate | | Vlissingen | Dutch Republic | For Dutch Navy. |
| Unknown date | Name unknown | | | | Great Britain | For Royal Navy. |
