= George Darby =

Royal Navy officer (1720–1790)

Vice-Admiral of the Red George Darby
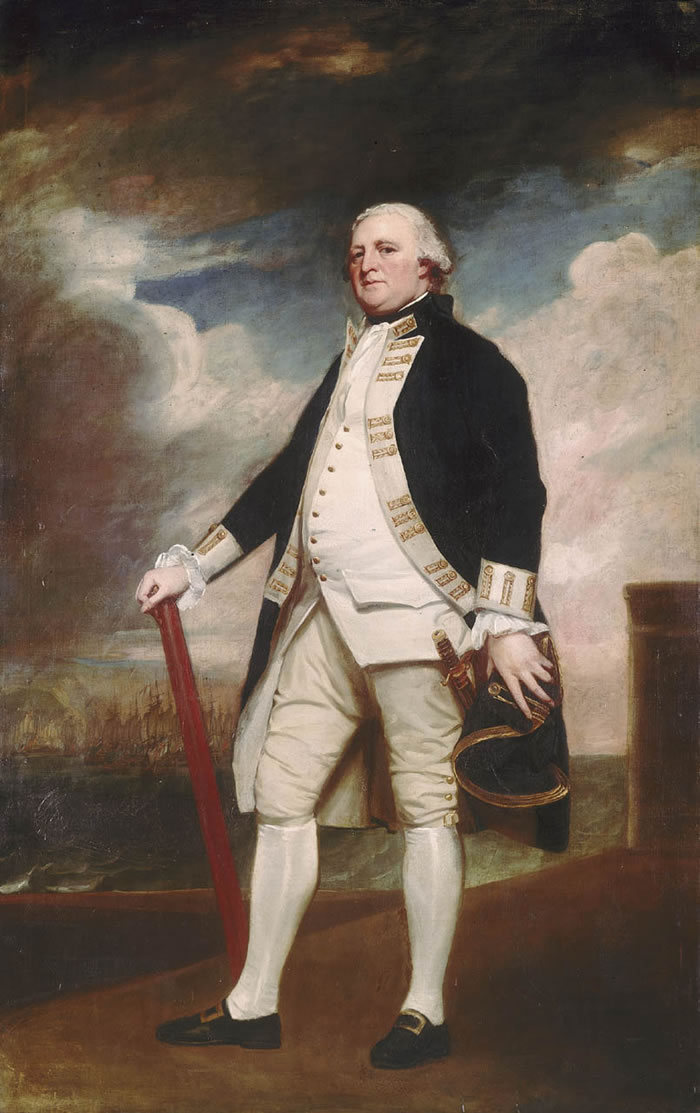
- Portrait by George Romney, 1783–1786
- Born: 1720; King's County, Ireland
- Died: 26 March 1790 (aged 69–70) England
- Allegiance: Great Britain
- Branch: Royal Navy
- Service years: 1742–1782
- Rank: Vice-Admiral of the Red
- Commands: HMS Aldborough; HMS Seahorse; HMS Norwich; HMS Devonshire; Channel Fleet
- Conflicts: Seven Years' War; Invasion of Martinique (1762); American War of Independence; Great Siege of Gibraltar

Vice-Admiral of the Red George Darby (c. 1720 – 26 March 1790) was a Royal Navy officer. He commanded HMS Norwich at the invasion of Martinique in 1762 during the Seven Years' War. He went on to command the Western Squadron during the American War of Independence and later in that war served as First Naval Lord when he commanded the force that relieved Gibraltar in April 1781 during the Great Siege of Gibraltar.

== Early life and naval career ==
George Darby was born c. 1720 in King's County, Ireland, the second son of Jonathan Darby of Leap Castle and his wife Anna. He joined the Royal Navy as a volunteer-per-order in September 1742. Darby was promoted to lieutenant on 7 September 1742 and was promoted again to post-captain and made captain of HMS Aldborough on 12 September 1747. During the Seven Years' War he was made captain of HMS Seahorse in 1756, HMS Norwich in 1757 and HMS Devonshire in 1760. Darby served under Rear-Admiral of the Blue George Rodney during the invasion of Martinique in 1762.

== American War of Independence ==
On 23 January 1778 Darby was promoted to Rear-Admiral of the White during the American War of Independence. Admiral of the Blue Augustus Keppel's resignation during the controversy following the Battle of Ushant fought on 27 July 1778 left a vacancy for command of the Channel Fleet. On 19 March 1779 Darby was promoted to Vice-Admiral of the Blue during the court martial of Vice-Admiral of the Blue Hugh Palliser thanks to Darby's association with First Lord of the Admiralty Lord Sandwich. Thus he unexpectedly came to command the Channel Fleet in 1780.

Darby was appointed to the Board of Admiralty and made First Naval Lord in the North ministry in September 1780; on 26 September in the same year he was promoted to Vice-Admiral of the White. In April 1781 he relieved Gibraltar during the Great Siege of Gibraltar; the relief attempt was the second made after Rodney carried out an identical mission in 1780. This event was recorded in a full-length portrait of Darby made by George Romney betewen 1783 and 1786. Following the change of ministry in April 1782 Darby resigned his command and did not again serve at sea; he also resigned his seat on the Board of Admiralty. Darby served as a member of parliament for Plymouth from 1780 to 1784. He retired to Newtown House at Newtown in Hampshire and was promoted again to Vice-Admiral of the Red on 24 September 1787 before dying on 26 March 1790.

== Personal life ==
When in England he lived at Newtown House, Newtown, Hampshire and had five children. Darby was married to Mary, daughter of Sir William St Quintin, 4th Baronet and then to Ann Bridges, a widow whose brother was colonial agent and MP, Richard Jackson. Darby's male issue achieved high military rank and held significant wealth:

- William Thomas St Quentin (1769-1805) lived at Darby House, Sunbury on Thames and later at Scampston Hall, Malton, Yorkshire
  - Colonel Matthew Chitty Downes St. Quintin (his son)
- Major-General Matthew Chitty Darby-Griffith (1772–1823) lived at Padworth House, Berkshire

== Sources ==
- Rodger, N.A.M. (1979). The Admiralty. Offices of State. Lavenham: T. Dalton Ltd. ISBN 0900963948.
- Laughton, John Knox (1888). "Darby, George" . In Stephen, Leslie (ed.). Dictionary of National Biography. Vol. 14. London: Smith, Elder & Co.

Military offices
Preceded by Robert Man	First Naval Lord; 1780–1782	Succeeded by Sir Robert Harland
Honorary titles
Preceded by Lord Rodney	Rear-Admiral of Great Britain; 1781–1790	Succeeded by Lord Bridport
