= French ship Intrépide (1747) =

Ship of the line of the French Navy

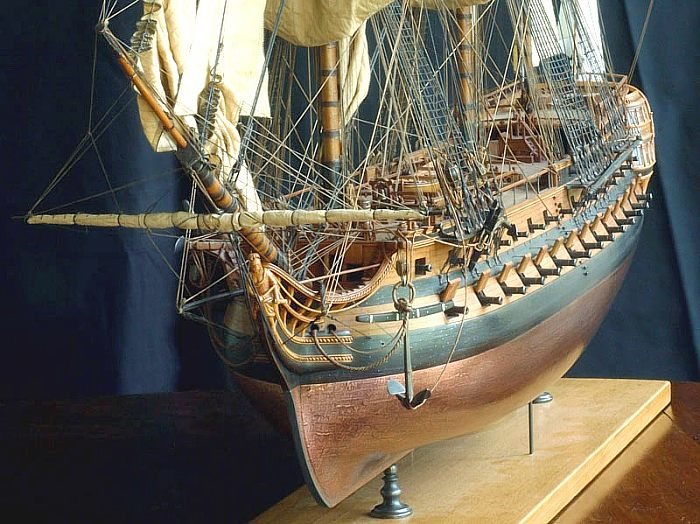
- A 74-gun French ship of the line similar to Intrépide

History

France
- Name: Intrépide
- Builder: Blaise Ollivier and Luc Coulomb, Brest Dockyard
- Laid down: January 1745
- Launched: 24 March 1747
- Commissioned: August 1747
- Fate: Burnt by accident on 22 July 1781

General characteristics
- Class & type: Monarque-class 74-gun ship of the line
- Displacement: 2718 tonneaux
- Tons burthen: 1500 port tonneaux
- Length: 166 French feet
- Beam: 43½ French feet
- Draught: 21 French feet
- Depth of hold: 20½ French feet
- Propulsion: Sails
- Sail plan: Full-rigged ship
- Complement: 734 in wartime, 650 peacetime;+ 6/10 officers
- Armament: 74 guns of various weights of shot

Intrépide was a 74-gun ship of the line of the French Navy. She was of three ships of the Monarque class, all launched in 1747, the others being Monarque and Sceptre.

== Design ==
Designed by Blaise Ollivier and built by him until his death in October 1746, then completed by Luc Coulomb, her keel was laid down at Brest on 14 November 1745 towards the end of the War of the Austrian Succession and she was launched on 24 March 1747. The fifth ship of this type to be built by the French Navy, she was designed to the norms set for ships of the line by French shipbuilders in the 1740s to try to match the cost, armament and maneuverability of their British counterparts, since the Royal Navy had had a greater number of ships than the French since the end of the wars of Louis XIV. Without being standardized, dozens of French 74-gun ships were based on these norms right up until the start of the 19th century, slowly evolving to match new shipbuilding technologies and the wishes of naval tacticians and strategists.

Her 74 guns comprised 28 × 36-pounders on the lower deck, 30 × 18-pounders on the upper deck, 10 × 8-pounders on the quarterdeck and 6 × 8-pounders on the forecastle.

== Service ==
=== War of the Austrian Succession ===
Intrépide fought at the Second Battle of Cape Finisterre on 25 October 1747, forming part of Henri-François des Herbiers's division, which also included the admiral's flagship the 80-gun Tonnant, the 74-gun Monarque and Terrible, four 56-to-68 gun ships and a 26-gun frigate. They were charged with escorting a convoy of over 250 merchant vessels to the Antilles and faced Edward Hawke and his 14-ship squadron.

The engagement lasted nearly seven hours and saw six French ships captured. Heading the French line and captained by the experienced commander de Vaudreuil, Intrépide was little damaged, since she was the last ship attacked by the British squadron. She escaped her pursuers and saved Tonnant, allowing her to disengage. The following dawn Intrépide managed to take Tonnant in tow. Their success was not only down to their commanders but also the fact that they were new powerful ships, easier to handle and with more modern armament than older ships in the British and French fleets. They arrived at Brest on 9 November 1747 whilst the convoy safely reached the Antilles.

She was used as the test-bed for an inclining experiment (the first such ever recorded) which was performed in May 1748 by François-Guillaume Clairain-Deslauriers.

=== Seven Years' War ===
The Battle of Quiberon Bay, which Intrépide fought in

In 1756 Intrépide was put under the command of Guy François Coëtnempren de Kersaint and made the flagship of a squadron ordered to attack British shipping off the coast of Guinea. Following a successful operation in the region Intrépide was sent to the West Indies, where she was attacked near Caicos on 21 October 1757 by three British ships of the line in the Battle of Cap-Français. This lasted several hours and Intrépide was almost completely dismasted, whilst her captain was wounded twice; the French retreated, though the battered British ships proved unable to pursue.

In 1759 she joined a fleet under Hubert de Brienne. Intrépide took part in the Battle of Quiberon Bay on 20 November that year under the command of Charles Le Mercerel de Chasteloger, joining Soleil-Royal in an unsuccessful attack against the British flagship HMS Royal George. On 21 November Intrépide and seven other French ships of the line left the battlefield to take refuge at Rochefort. Intrépide subsequently underwent a rebuilding at Brest from 1758 to April 1759, carried out by Léon-Michel Guignace.

=== American Revolutionary War ===
From January 1776 to March 1778 Intrépide was commanded by François Joseph Paul de Grasse. She took part in the Battle of Ushant on 27 July 1778 under the command of Châteauvert in the blue squadron, which formed the French fleet's rearguard and was commanded by Louis-Philippe d'Orléans. In 1780 she joined Guichen's fleet sent to fight in the Antilles. On 17 April 1780, under the command of Parscau-Plessix, she fought in the battle of Martinique, again in the rearguard. She was finally lost on 22 July 1781 off Cap Français, when a barrel of local rum caught fire and the ship was burned and sunk. Several crew members drowned.
