= HMS Terrible (1747) =

French warship captured by the British

- Ship plan of Terrible

History

France
- Name: Terrible
- Ordered: 16 April 1737
- Builder: Toulon
- Laid down: November 1736
- Launched: 19 December 1739
- Completed: 1740
- Captured: By the Royal Navy on 14 October 1747

General characteristics
- Class & type: 74-gun second rank ship of the line
- Displacement: 2800 tonneaux
- Tons burthen: 1500 port tonneaux
- Length: 156 French feet (overall) (Note: Note that the French (pre-metric) foot was about 6.5% longer than the British equivalent); 131 French feet (keel)
- Beam: 44 French feet 4 inches
- Depth of hold: 21 French feet
- Sail plan: Full-rigged ship
- Complement: 620 wartime, 550 peacetime; + 6 officers
- Armament: Lower deck: 28 × 36-pdrs; Upper deck: 30 × 18-pdrs; Quarter deck: 10 × 8-pdrs; Forecastle: 6 × 8-pdrs; Poop: 4 × 4-pdrs (until removed 1744)

Great Britain
- Name: HMS Terrible
- Acquired: 14 October 1747
- Fate: Sold for breaking up, completed by 16 February 1763

General characteristics
- Class & type: 74-gun third rate ship of the line
- Tons burthen: 1,590 28/94 bm as remeasured by the British
- Length: 164 ft 3 in (50.1 m) (overall); 133 ft 11 in (40.8 m) (keel)
- Beam: 47 ft 3 in (14.4 m)
- Depth of hold: 20 ft 7.5 in (6.29 m)
- Sail plan: Full-rigged ship
- Complement: 650
- Armament: Lower deck: 28 × 32-pdrs; Upper deck: 30 × 18-pdrs; Quarter deck: 10 × 9-pdrs; Forecastle: 6 × 9-pdrs

Terrible was originally a 74-gun ship of the line of the French Navy launched in 1739. Captured on 14 October 1747, she was taken into Royal Navy service as the third rate HMS Terrible.

== Design and construction ==
Terrible was laid down at Toulon in November 1736 to a design by François Coulomb the Younger. This ship significantly modified the existing 74-gun concept with a longer hull, enabling the fitting of an extra pair of guns on both the lower and upper decks, compared with previous 74s. This initially raised the number of guns to 78 in wartime (70 in peacetime), but in 1744 the four small 4-pounder guns on the poop were deleted (as ineffective). This ordnance layout was to become the standard pattern for all French 74-gun ships for the next half century. Launched on 19 December 1739, she was completed the following year.

== French career and capture ==
Terrible took part in the Battle of Toulon on 22 February 1744, as the flagship of Capitaine de Vaisseau Charles-Élisée Court de la Bruyère. On 17 October 1746 she captured the British 50-gun HMS Severn in the English Channel. She was part of the French fleet under Henri-François des Herbiers, Marquis de l'Estenduère which fought at the Second Battle of Cape Finisterre on 25 October 1747, and was captured by a British fleet under Admiral Sir Edward Hawke.

== British career ==
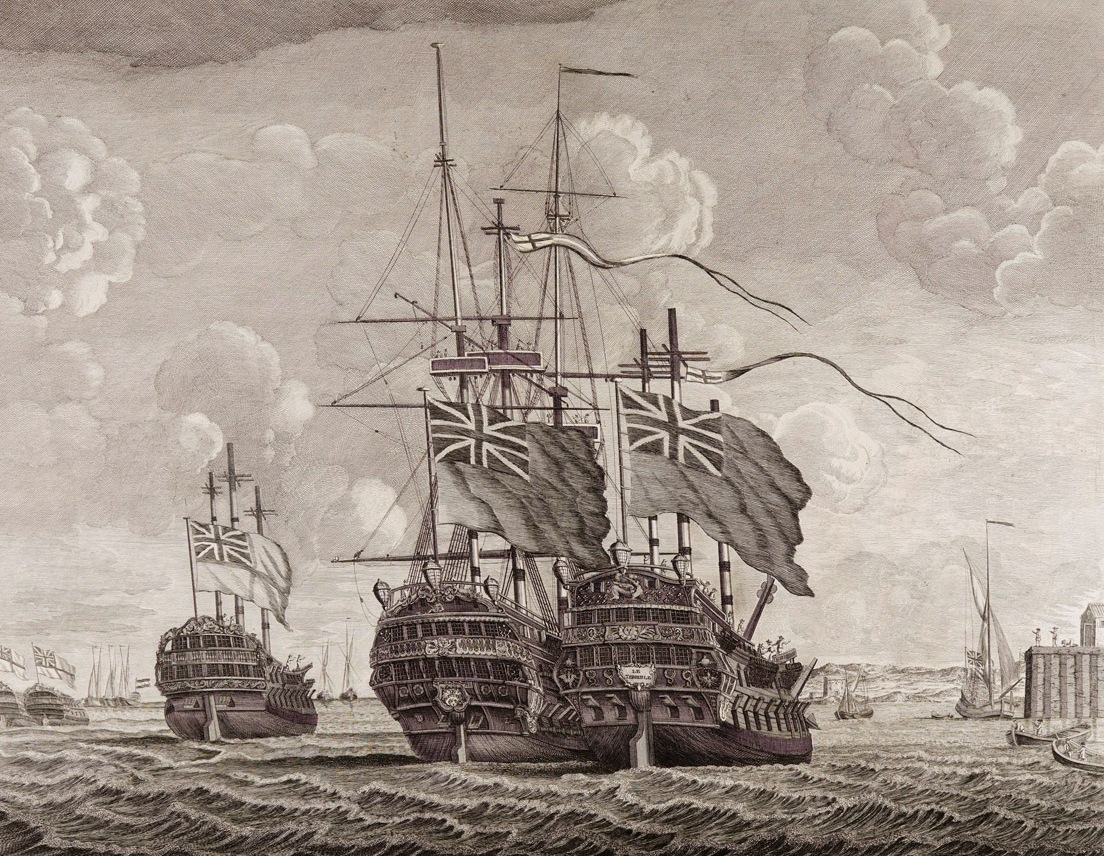
Terrible (center) flying the British flag after her capture.

Terrible was brought into Portsmouth and surveyed there in June 1748. The Navy Board authorised her purchase on 30 September 1748, paying a total of £11,211.11.0d, once a sum had been abated for repairs. A small repair was carried out at Portsmouth for £7,024.18.6d between April and August 1750, and she was fitted out for service in 1753. She was commissioned in May that year as the Portsmouth guardship, under the command of Captain Robert Pett. and with Samuel Hood as an officer. She passed to Captain Philip Durell in March 1755, and later was under Captain William Holborne, while serving as the flagship of Rear-Admiral Francis Holburne. Terrible was sent as a reinforcement for Vice-Admiral Edward Boscawen in May 1755, and was despatched again in April 1756, this time to reinforce Vice-Admiral Edward Hawke. Captain Richard Collins took command of her later in 1756, and in the summer of that year Terrible went out to join Boscawen's fleet, where she came under the command of Captain Death.

She went out to North America in April 1757, and was present at the Siege of Louisbourg in 1758. She returned to North America in early 1759, being at the assault on Quebec in 1759. She returned to Britain after this, and was surveyed on 1 April 1760. An admiralty order was issued on 31 December 1762, instructing her to be broken up. She was broken up at Chatham, a process completed by 16 February 1763.

== See also ==
- List of ships captured in the 18th century
