= Louis-Philippe de Rigaud, Marquis de Vaudreuil =

Louis-Philippe de Vaudreuil
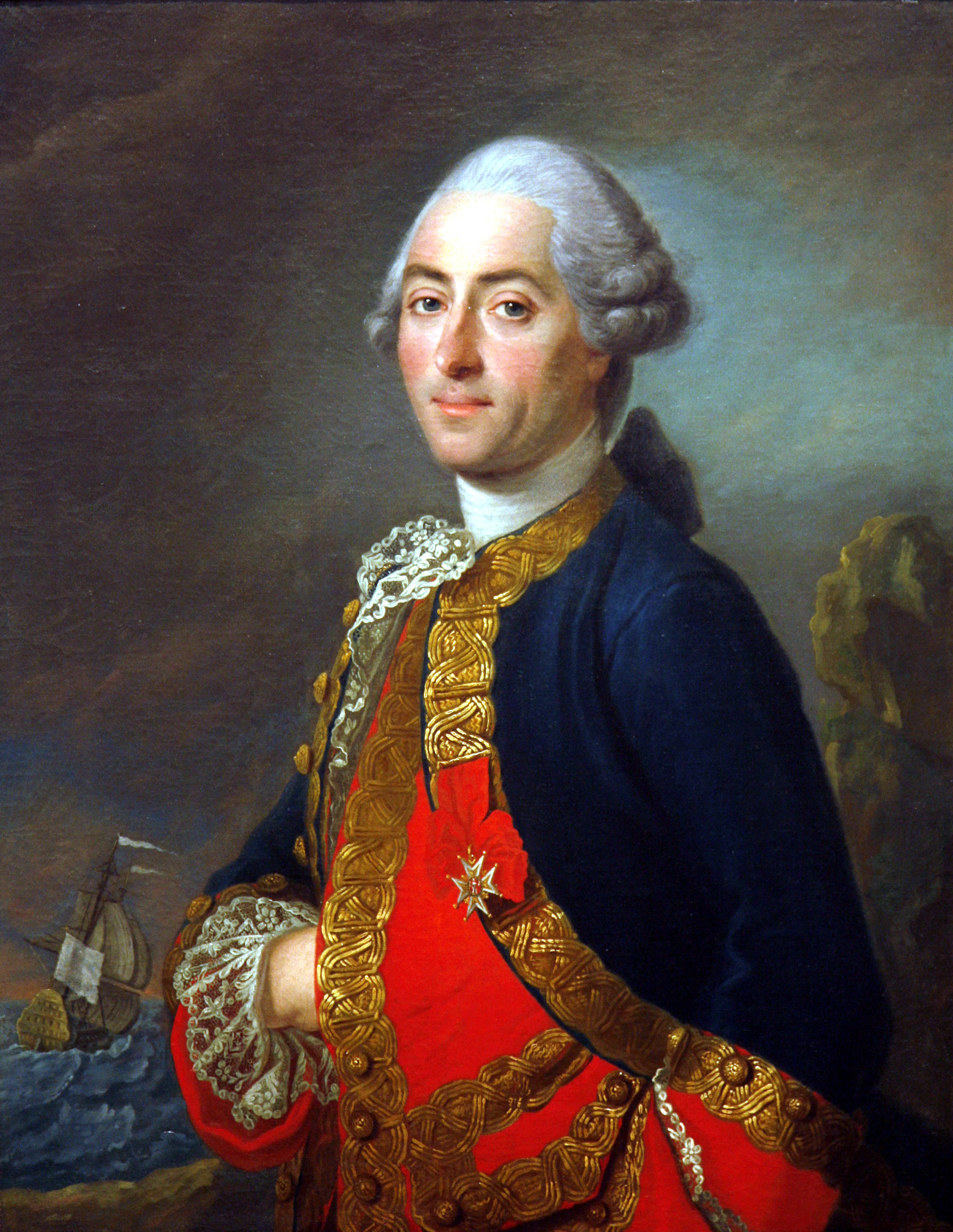
- 1750 portrait of Vaudreuil by Claude Arnulphy
- Born: 28 October 1724; Rochefort, France
- Died: 14 December 1802 (aged 78); Paris, France
- Military career
- Allegiance: France
- Branch: French Navy
- Service years: 1778–1783
- Rank: Admiral, second only to Count de Grasse
- Units: Spectre; Triomphant
- Conflicts: War of the Austrian Succession; Battle of Toulon; Second Battle of Cape Finisterre (1747); Duc d'Anville expedition; Seven Years' War; American Revolutionary War; Battle of Ushant; Battle of the Chesapeake; Siege of Yorktown; Battle of the Saintes
- Awards: Order of Saint-Louis

Louis-Philippe de Rigaud, Marquis de Vaudreuil (18 April 1724 – 14 December 1802) was a French Navy officer who served in the War of the Austrian Succession, Seven Years' War and American Revolutionary War.

== Early life ==
Louis-Philippe Rigaud de Vaudreuil was born into a family with a rich political and military tradition. His grandfather, Philippe de Rigaud de Vaudreuil, and his uncle Pierre de Rigaud de Vaudreuil de Cavagnal, were both governors of Canada; the latter was its last governor, surrendering Montreal to the British in 1760. Another uncle, Pierre-François de Rigaud, fought with Montcalm at the Battle of Oswego. His father, also named Louis-Philippe de Rigaud de Vaudreuil, was an admiral of the French Navy: he saved Desherbiers de l'Etenduère at the Second battle of Cape Finisterre while commanding the 74-gun Intrépide and was in charge of the Navy in North America in 1747. His younger brother, Louis de Rigaud de Vaudreuil, was also a Navy officer. They served together in 1747 on the 74-gun Intrépide. Although his father was born in Quebec City and there are claims that Louis-Philippe the son was born in Canada, it is more probable that he was born in Rochefort, France, as his father was in charge of that city on the west coast of France at the time.

Vaudreuil took part in the Battle of Toulon on 22 February 1744, serving of Heureux, captained by his father. He was promoted to lnsign in January 1746, and served on Tigre in Duc d'Anville expedition. He was promoted to lieutenant in 1754, and given command of the frigate Fidèle, and later of Aréthuse. On 18 May 1759, Aréthuse was captured off the Brittany coast by a British squadron serving in the Royal Navy. Vaudreuil was taken prisoner and his ship was recommissioned under the name HMS Arethusa, later known as "Saucy Arethusa". Vaudreuil was promoted to captain in 1765. In 1769, he captained the 50-gun Hippopotame, ferrying troops to the Caribbeans. Under the command of the Marquis de Vaudreuil and Armand Louis de Gontaut, the French captured Senegal in January 1779

=== American Revolutionary War ===
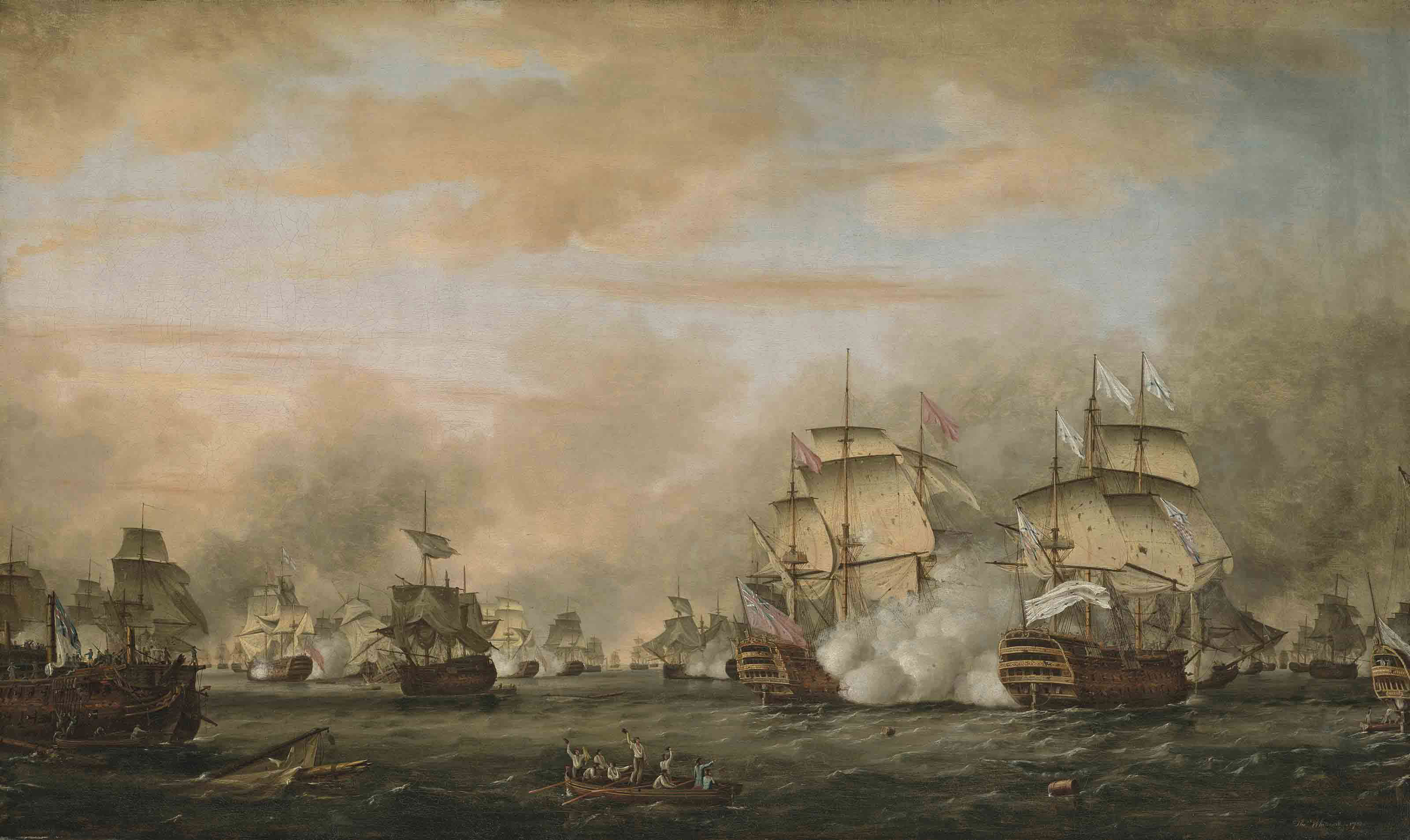
The Battle of the Saintes, which Vaudreuil fought in

Vaudreuil was dispatched to America when the French entered the war on the side of the Americans in February 1778. His first engagement came at the Battle of Ushant, an island on the north-west part of France near Brest, where the French Navy and Royal Navy fought to a draw. He was at sea for about five months.

Vaudreuil was on the Sceptre in the Battle of the Chesapeake. After one furious engagement with the British navy, Admiral François Joseph Paul de Grasse's fleet and the British fleet drifted for miles south of Yorktown and lost sight of each other. De Grasse eventually disengaged and returned to the Chesapeake, where he met the fleet of the Comte de Barras. This combined fleet outnumbered the British fleet, and gave the French control of the bay when the British opted not to attack. This had the effect of cutting the army of Charles Cornwallis off from resupply and relief, leading to the siege of Yorktown and his surrender. Vaudreuil's contribution to this effort was to provide the cavalry of Duke of Lauzun, a foreign legion that was a mix of Russian, Slavic, Polish and German mercenaries in the service of France. He also provided eight hundred men from his ship to Gloucester Point in defence of a peninsula near Yorktown. Together with the Duke of Lauzun these men fought the cavalry of Banastre Tarleton, and defeated them.

In the 1782 Battle of the Saintes, Vaudreuil was credited with saving most of the French Navy's ships in the disastrous French defeat. Since De Grasse was taken prisoner Vaudreuil took command of the entire French fleet in America. Afterward, Vaudreuil was on the flagship Triumphant in Boston harbor. He commanded the squadron intended to attack the British colony of Jamaica, and for that purpose welcomed Capt. John Paul Jones as an American naval officer volunteer, when word came that the war had ended by treaty in early 1783. Vaudreuil was then responsible for bringing the victorious French army of Rochambeau back to France.

=== French Revolution ===
Vaudreuil, with other Naval officers, forced his way into the Palace of Versailles on the night of October 5–6, 1789 to protect the royal family. He then emigrated to London in 1791, returning to Paris in 1800. Upon returning, he was granted a Naval pension by Napoleon.
