= Marquis de Vaudreuil =

The Marquis de Vaudreuil may refer to:

- Philippe de Rigaud de Vaudreuil (1643–1702), governor of Montréal then of New France
- Pierre de Rigaud de Vaudreuil (1698–1778), last governor-general of New France
- Louis-Philippe de Rigaud, Marquis of Vaudreuil (1691 – 1763), French admiral
- Louis-Philippe de Rigaud, Marquis de Vaudreuil (1724 – 1802), French admiral, son of the former
