= French ship Tonnant (1743) =

Flagship involved with battles of three wars in Europe and North America

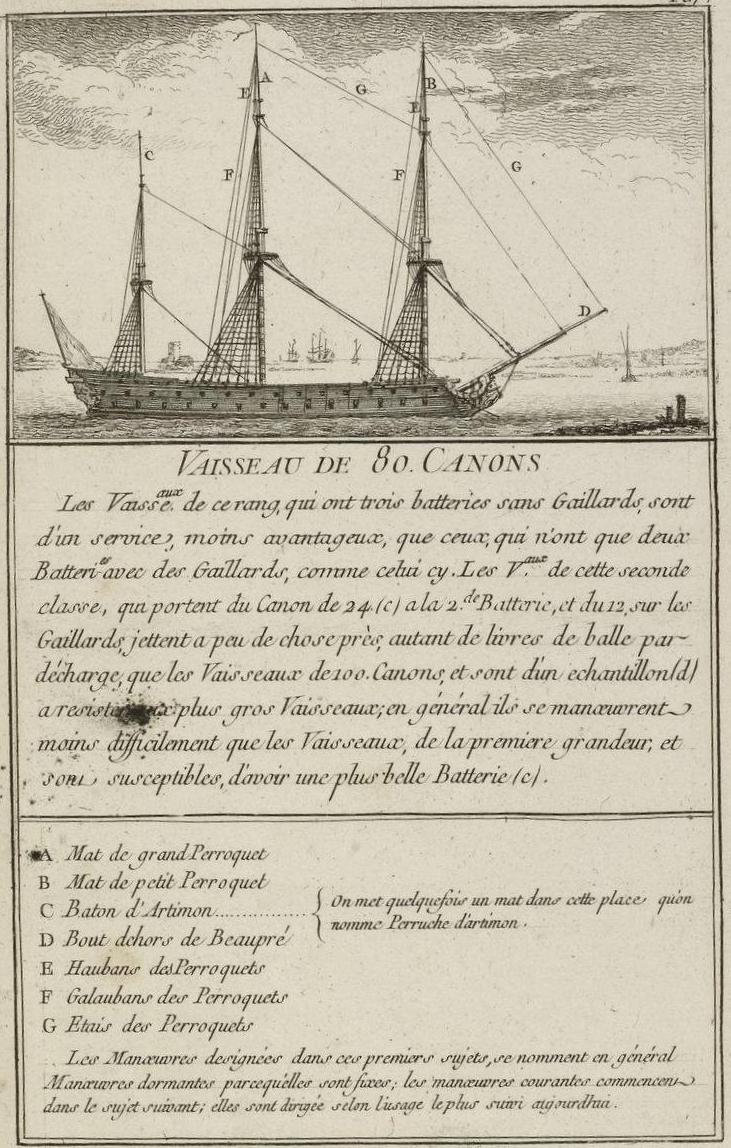
- Vaisseau de 80 canons Ship of 80 guns. Text and drawings made by Nicolas Ozanne (1764)

History

France
- Name: Tonnant
- Namesake: Thundering
- Ordered: 12 June 1740
- Builder: Toulon
- Laid down: 18 October 1740
- Launched: 17 November 1743
- In service: June 1744
- Stricken: April 1780
- Fate: Broken up November 1780

General characteristics
- Displacement: 3400 tonneaux
- Tons burthen: 1700 port tonneaux
- Length: 54.6 m (179 ft 2 in)
- Beam: 14.9 m (48 ft 11 in)
- Draught: 7.5 m (24 ft 7 in)
- Propulsion: Sail
- Armament: 80 guns: 30 × 36-pounders; 32 × 18-pounders; 18 × 8-pounders
- Armour: Timber

Tonnant was an 80-gun ship of the line of the French Navy.

She was the flagship of the French fleet at the Second battle of Cape Finisterre, and later took part in the Battle of Quiberon Bay, and in the American War of Independence.

She was broken up in 1780.

== Construction ==
Constructed in Toulon between 1740 and 1744, she was armed with 80 cannons.

== Involvements ==
Tonnant was the flagship of Louis XV's fleet, and thus served as Admiral vessel to Marquis de l'Estenduère during the Second battle of Cape Finisterre in 1747. During this naval battle, eight French vessels were sacrificed when they took on the fourteen British ships by Admiral Hawke, to protect the merchant ships. The Tonnant was involved in fierce combat. Partly dismasted, she escaped by being towed by the Intrépide of Vaudreuil, who crossed British lines to secure the ship.

The Tonnant also participated at the Battle of Quiberon Bay in 1759; on board was the Chevalier de Bauffremont. The ship escaped and took refuge at Rochefort.

She was refurbished in 1770, and participated in the campaign of Admiral Estaing in America in 1778–1779 including the attack on Newport in 1778 and the Battle of Grenada on 6 July 1779. The ship was broken up in 1780.

== See also ==
- List of ships of the line of France
