= French ship Content =

Several ships of the French Navy have borne the name Content:

- Content (1672), hulked in 1685.
- Content (1686), captured in 1695 by HMS Plymouth and taken into service as HMS Content and hulked in 1703.
- Content (1695), sold for breaking up in 1712.
- Content (1717), sold in 1747.
- Content (1747), captured in 1793 at Toulon and burnt.
