= Portrait of Admiral Byng =

Painting by Thomas Hudson

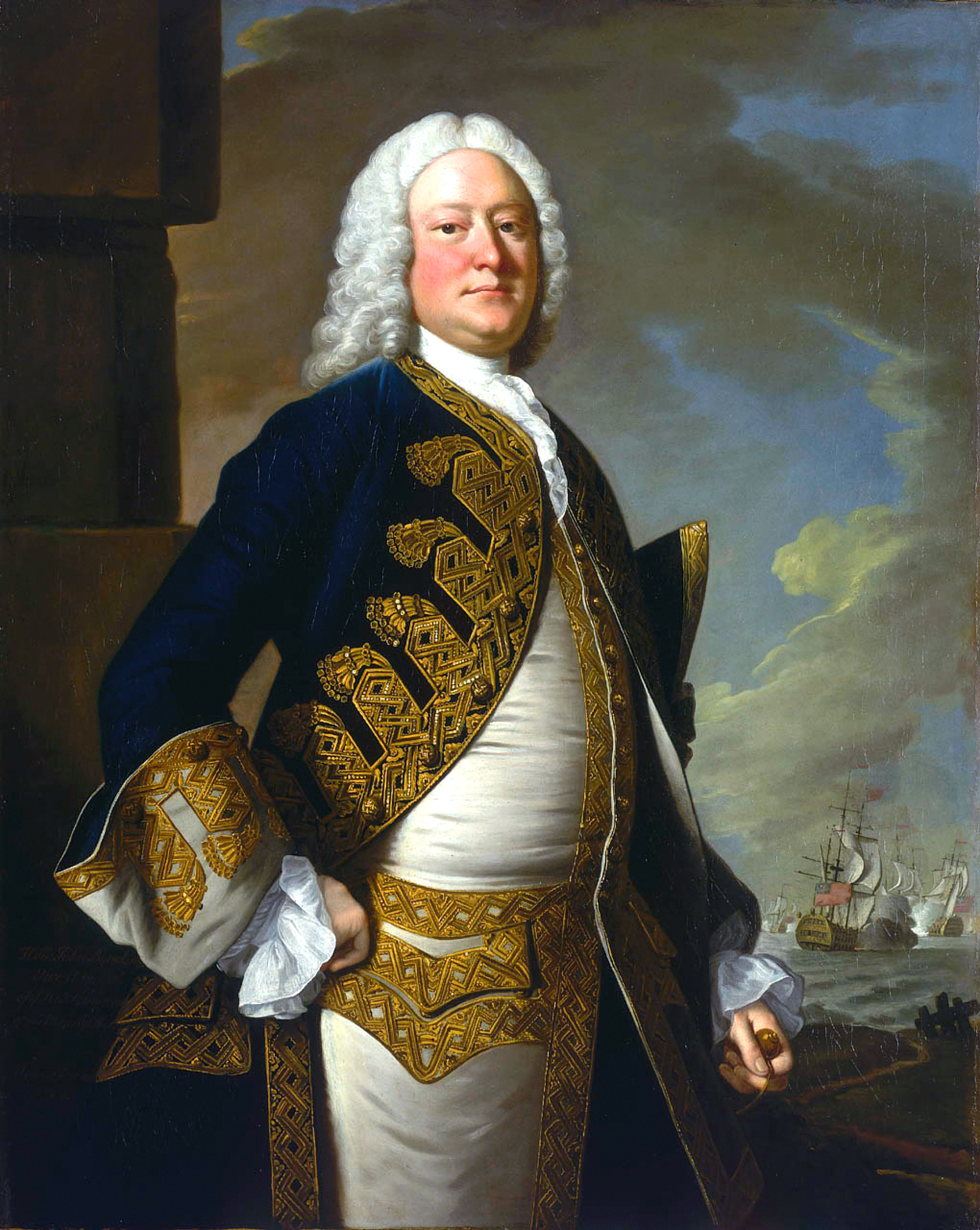
- Artist: Thomas Hudson
- Year: 1749
- Type: Oil on canvas, portrait
- Dimensions: 127 cm × 101.6 cm (50 in × 40.0 in)
- Location: National Maritime Museum, London

Portrait of Admiral Byng is an oil on canvas portrait painting by the English artist Thomas Hudson, from 1749.

== History and description ==
It depicts the British admiral John Byng. Byng served in the Royal Navy from 1718, rose through the ranks, and is today known primarily for his failed attempt to relieve the Siege of Minorca during the early stages of the Seven Years' War. After an indecisive engagement with a French fleet at the Battle of Minorca, Byng withdrew to Gibraltar, where the Minorca's garrison was forced to surrender. Arrested and tried on his return to Britain, a court martial condemned him to death, and in March 1757, he was shot on the quarterdeck of HMS Monarch in Portsmouth Harbour. The execution was referenced in the novel Candide by Voltaire.

Hudson was a noted portraitist of the mid-eighteenth century. He depicts Byng, then a Vice Admiral, in the recently introduced flag officer's full-dress uniform. Today, the work is in the collection of the National Maritime Museum in Greenwich.

== Bibliography ==
- Hamilton, Olive & Hamilton, Nigel. Royal Greenwich: A Guide and History to London's Most Historic Borough. Greenwich Bookshop, 1969.
- Krulder, Joseph K. The Execution of Admiral John Byng as a Microhistory of Eighteenth-Century Britain. Routledge, 2021.
- Johnston, A.J.B. Endgame 1758: The Promise, the Glory, and the Despair of Louisbourg's Last Decade. University of Nebraska Press, 2007.
