= Second Battle of Cape Finisterre =

1747 battle in the War of the Austrian Succession

- Part of the War of the Austrian Succession
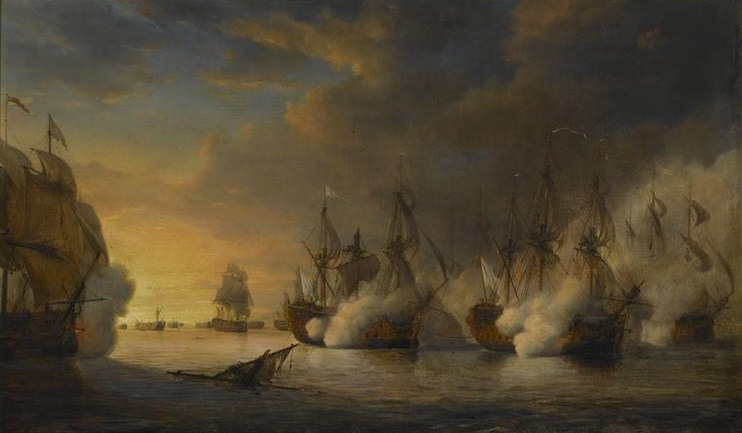
- Intrépide (centre) fighting several British ships at the battle
Date	14 October 1747 (O.S.)
Location	300 miles (480 km) west of Finistère, Atlantic Ocean 47°49′N 12°0′W
Result	British victory

Belligerents
Great Britain	France

Commanders and leaders
Edward Hawke	Henri-François des Herbiers

Strength
14 ships of the line	8 ships of the line; 1 frigate; 251 merchant ships

Casualties and losses
154 killed; 558 wounded	800 killed or wounded; 4,000 captured; 6 ships of the line captured; 7 merchant ships captured
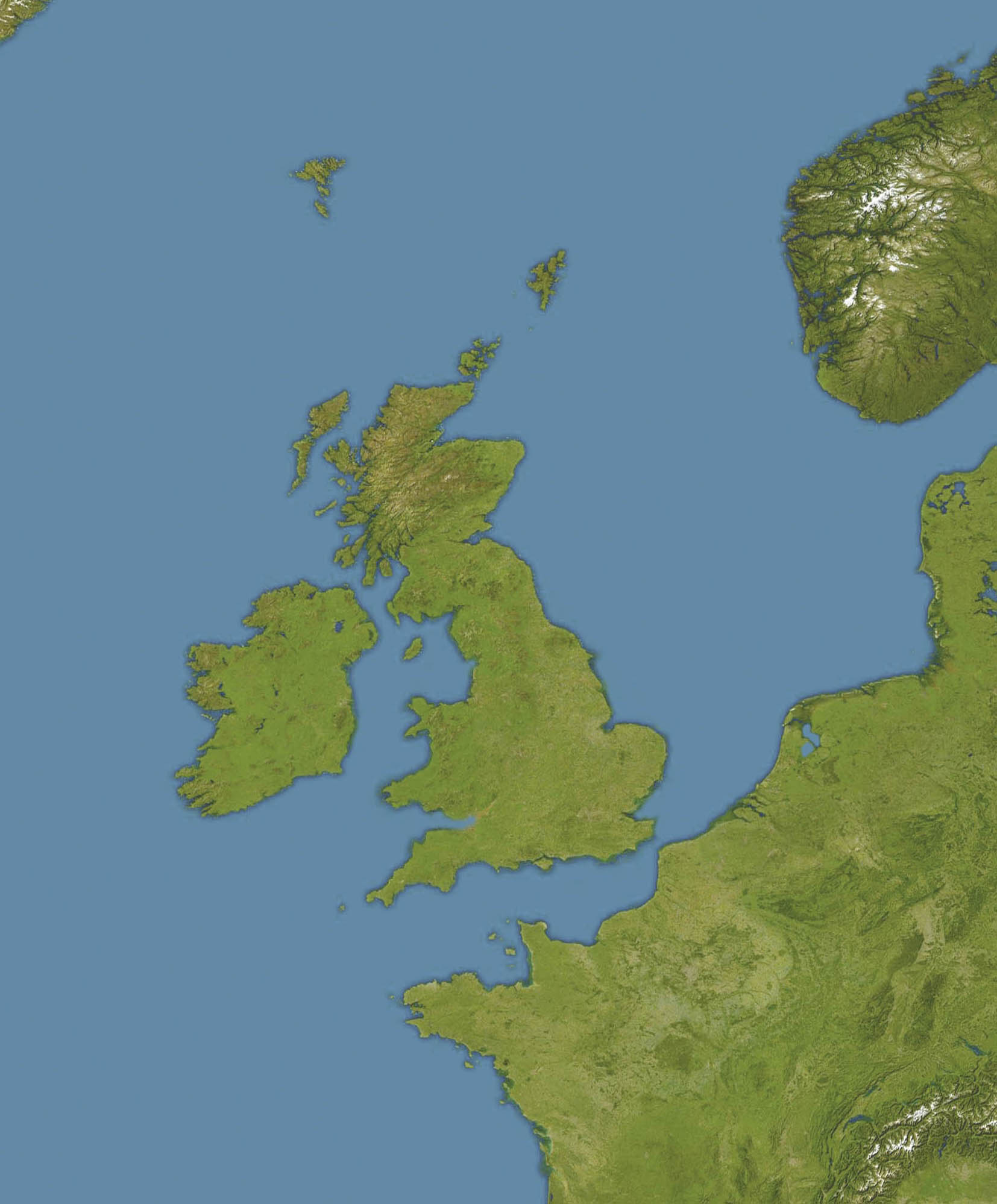
- Battle location

The second battle of Cape Finisterre was a naval encounter fought during the War of the Austrian Succession on 25 October 1747. (Note: The battle was fought on 14 October 1747 by the Julian calendar then in use in Great Britain. Following the normal convention, all dates are Old Style and use the Julian calendar; they also assume that each year starts on 1 January.) A British fleet of fourteen ships of the line commanded by Rear-Admiral Edward Hawke intercepted a French convoy of 250 merchant ships, sailing from the Basque Roads in western France to the West Indies and protected by eight ships of the line commanded by Vice Admiral Henri-François des Herbiers.

When the two forces sighted each other, Herbiers ordered the merchant ships to scatter, formed his warships into a line of battle and attempted to draw the British warships towards him. In this he was successful, the British advanced on the French warships, enveloped the rear of the French line and brought superior numbers to bear on the French vessels one at a time. Six of the French warships were captured, along with 4,000 of their seamen. Of the 250 merchant ships, only 7 were captured.

The British victory isolated the French colonies from supply and reinforcement. The war ended the following year and under the Treaty of Aix-la-Chapelle France recovered those colonial possessions which had been captured in return for withdrawing from her territorial gains in the Austrian Netherlands (approximately modern Belgium and Luxembourg).

== Background ==
The War of the Austrian Succession (1740–1748) involved France, Spain and Prussia fighting Britain, Austria and the Dutch Republic. The pretext for the war was Maria Theresa's right to inherit her father Emperor Charles VI's crown in the Habsburg Empire, but France, Prussia and Bavaria really saw it as an opportunity to challenge Habsburg power and gain territory. French military strategy focused on potential threats on its eastern and northern borders; its colonies were left to fend for themselves, or given minimal resources, anticipating they would probably be lost anyway. This strategy was driven by a combination of geography, and the superiority of the British navy, which made it difficult for the French navy to provide substantial quantities of supplies or to militarily support the French colonies. The expectation was that military victory in Europe would compensate for any colonial losses; if necessary, gains in Europe could be exchanged for the return of captured colonial possessions. The British tried to avoid large-scale commitments of troops to Europe, taking advantage of their naval superiority over the French and Spanish to expand in the colonies and pursue a strategy of naval blockade.

=== Prelude ===
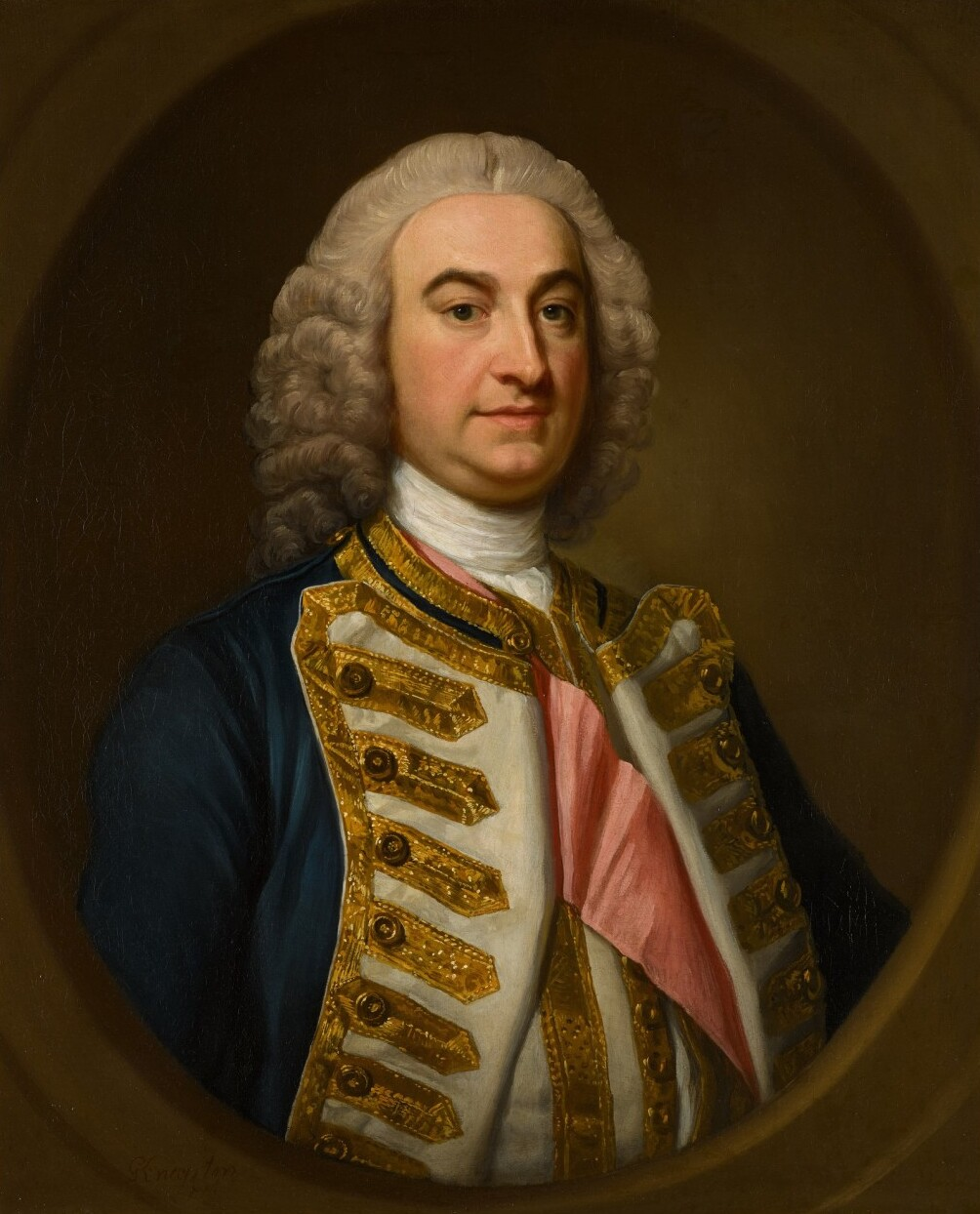
Edward Hawke

Early in 1747 a French fleet of six ships of the line, a category of warship that included the largest and most powerful warships of the time, and five Indiamen, which were large, well-armed merchant ships, commanded by Squadron Commander Jacques-Pierre de la Jonquière, were escorting a convoy of 40 merchantmen bound for the Caribbean and North America. They were intercepted on 3 May by a British force of fourteen ships of the line, commanded by Vice-Admiral George Anson. In the ensuing five-hour first battle of Cape Finisterre the French lost all six ships of the line captured, as well as two frigates, two Indiamen and seven merchantmen. The fierce French resistance enabled most of the merchant ships to escape. On 20 June, 8 British ships under Commodore Thomas Fox intercepted a large French convoy inbound from the West Indies. The escorting French warships fled and 48 of 160 merchantmen were captured.

By summer Anson was based ashore, in London, and his subordinate, Admiral Peter Warren, commander of the Western Squadron, was ill with scurvy. As a result, Rear-Admiral of the White Edward Hawke was given command of a squadron of fourteen ships of the line which sailed from Plymouth on 9 August. Hawke introduced a new system of signalling between ships, which had the potential to enable an admiral to handle his fleet more aggressively, and instilled into his captains something of his own desire to give getting to grips with the enemy priority over rigid adherence to Admiralty sailing orders.

A large French convoy with a strong escort was assembling in Basque Roads, intending to sail for the West Indies. Hawke was tasked with intercepting it. Relatively inexperienced, he was given detailed orders, but he sailed well outside the limits laid down in them in his efforts to ensure that the convoy did not get past him. It seems that Hawke did not become aware of the contents of his orders until the day after he found and defeated the French. (Note: The naval historian Nicholas Rodger states that the orders had been "mysteriously 'mislaid' ". Quotation marks in original.) The French, commanded by Vice Admiral Henri-François des Herbiers, set off on 6 October.

== Battle ==
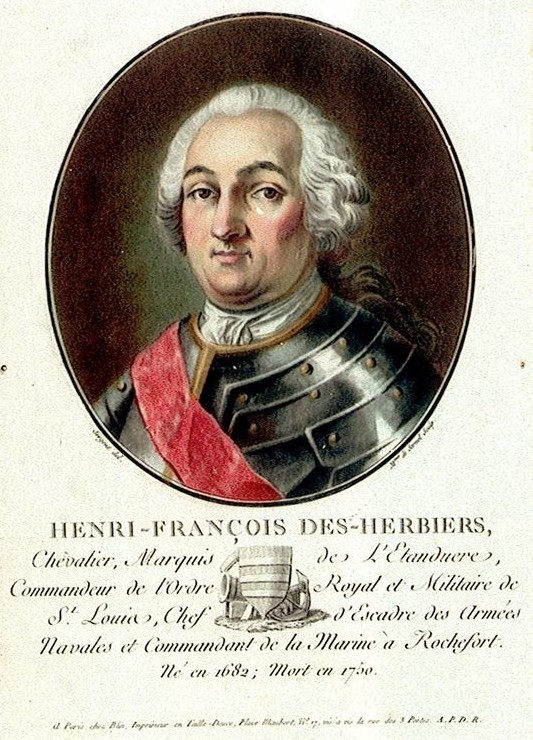
Henri-François des Herbiers

The French sailed on 6 October. Eight days later they were sighted by the British early on the morning of the 14th, approximately 300 miles (480 km) west of Finistère, the westernmost department of France. The British squadron consisted of the 14 ships of the line which had sailed, but they were all on the smaller side for such ships; the number of guns they were rated to carry varied from 50 to 74, with only one being rated for more than 66 guns. The French convoy consisted of 250 merchant ships, escorted by eight ships of the line, an Indiaman and a frigate. The French ships were rated for 56 to 80 guns, five being rated for 70 guns or more.

At first Hawke thought he was up against a much larger fleet of warships and formed a line of battle. Herbiers initially mistook the British ships for members of the French convoy; on realising his mistake he decided to use his warships to divert the British and allow the merchant ships to disperse, which he hoped would allow most of them to avoid capture. Hawke gave the flag signal for "general chase", ordering each of his ships to head towards the enemy at its maximum speed. The French had by now formed their own line of battle; the Indiaman Content, the frigate Castor and the smaller French ships stayed with the merchantmen. When within about 4 miles (6.4 km) of the French line, Hawke slowed the advance to permit his slower-moving ships to catch up. Herbiers edged his line away from the scattering merchantmen: either the British had to pursue the French warships, allowing the French merchant ships to escape, or they could pursue the merchantmen and run the risk of being attacked from the rear by Herbiers. About 11:00 Hawke again ordered "general chase" and closed with the French warships.

The British attacked the French rear in a very loose formation, but three British ships were able to get on to the far side of the French line. This meant that three French ships at the rear of their line were attacked on both sides by the British. By being able to attack each of these three French ships with two of their own, the British compensated for their own ships being individually weaker; the three rearmost French ships were also their weakest. By 13:30 two of them had surrendered. The British repeated the procedure as they moved up the French line, bringing several of their ships to bear on each of the French and commencing each attack by firing canister shot into the rigging of the French ships' sails to immobilise them. The English sailors were better trained and better disciplined than the French, which enabled them to maintain a greater rate of fire and outshoot them. (Note: For example, Defiance fired seventy broadsides during the battle, despite not being continuously engaged.) By 15:30 another pair of French ships had struck their colours. (Note: A ship's "colours", a national flag or battle ensign, are hauled down from her mast, or "struck", to indicate that the ship has surrendered.)

Of the remaining four French ships, three were engaged in running battles with superior forces of British ships and each one's mobility was restricted after damage to their rigging. The French flagship, the Tonnant, the most powerful vessel in either squadron, was holding off her opponents, but was surrounded. The leading French ship, the Intrépide, not yet having been fully engaged, turned back into the fight. With her assistance, Tonnant was able to break free and the two ships escaped to the east, fruitlessly pursued by the British. The final pair of French ships, attacked on all sides, surrendered. Most of the British ships had attacked as aggressively as Hawke had wished, closing to "pistol shot" range – that is to say, very close range. One ship which Hawke felt was less committed was the Kent; her captain was subsequently court martialled and dismissed from the navy.

The British lost 170 men killed and 577 wounded in the battle. Hawke was among the wounded, having been caught in a gunpowder explosion. The French lost approximately 800 killed and wounded and had 4,000 men taken prisoner. All of the British ships were damaged; all of the captured French ships were badly damaged - four had all of their masts shot away. Hawke's force was forced to lay to for two days to carry out repairs. Herbiers did succeed in his objective of protecting the convoy; of the 250 merchantmen only seven were captured. The balance of the convoy continued to the West Indies, but Hawke sent the sloop Weazel to warn the British Leeward Islands Squadron under Commodore George Pocock of their approach. This was able to intercept many of the merchant ships in late 1747 and early 1748, and trapped many others in Caribbean ports.

== Aftermath ==
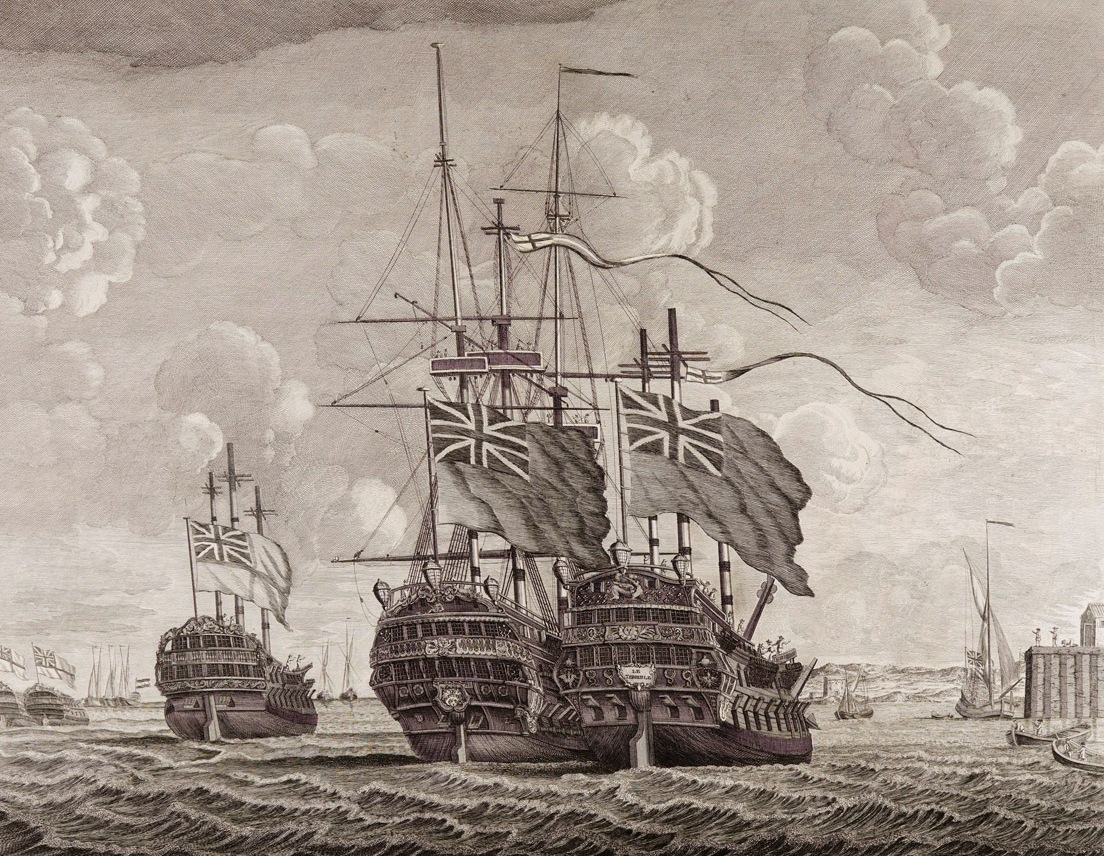
Three of the six French vessels captured during the battle: Terrible, Neptune and Severn

Warren exulted to the British government "we have more French ships in our ports than remain in the ports of France". The battle convinced the French government of its helplessness at sea and it made no further efforts to fight convoys through the British blockade. This soon brought most of France's colonies close to starvation, particularly in the West Indies, where the French possessions were not self-sufficient in food. France agreed to attend peace negotiations despite victories in the Low Countries and elsewhere.

A further consequence of the battle, along with Anson's earlier victory, was to give the British almost total control in the English Channel during the final months of the war. It proved ruinous to the French economy and to French national creditworthiness, helping the British to secure an acceptable peace. In 1748 the Treaty of Aix-la-Chapelle was agreed, bringing the war to an end. France recovered those colonial possessions that had been captured by the British in return for withdrawing from her territorial gains in the Austrian Netherlands (approximately modern Belgium and Luxembourg). The psychological impact of the two battles of Cape Finisterre continued into the Seven Years' War (1756–1763), when the French King, Louis XV, was reluctant to send men and supplies to French Canada and his other colonies.

== Order of battle ==
=== Britain (Edward Hawke) ===
Ships of the line: (Note: The number after each ship indicates number of guns it was rated to carry. The name in parentheses is that of the captain of the ship.)

- Devonshire 66 (flagship, John Moore)
- Edinburgh 70 (Thomas Cotes)
- Kent 64 (Thomas Fox)
- Yarmouth 64 (Charles Saunders)
- Monmouth 64 (Henry Harrison)
- Princess Louisa 60 (Charles Watson)
- Windsor 60 (Thomas Hanway)
- Lion 60 (Arthur Scott)
- Tilbury 60 (Robert Harland)
- Nottingham 60 (Philip Saumarez †)
- Defiance 60 (John Bentley)
- Eagle 60 (George Brydges Rodney)
- Gloucester 50 (Philip Durell)
- Portland 50 (Charles Steevens)

Fourth rate:

- Hector 44 (Thomas Stanhope)

Fireships:

- Dolphin 14 (Edward Crickett)
- Vulcan (William Pettigrew)

Sloop:

- Weazel 16

=== France (Henri-François des Herbiers) ===
Ships of the line:

- Tonnant 80 (flagship, Duchaffault) – escaped
- Intrépide 74 (Comte de Vaudreuil) – escaped
- Terrible 74 (Comte du Guay) – captured
- Monarque 74 (de la Bédoyère) – captured
- Neptune 70 (de Fromentière) – captured
- Trident 64 (Marquis d'Amblimont) – captured
- Fougueux 64 (du Vignau) – captured
- Severn 56 (du Rouret de Saint-Estève) – captured

Indiaman:

- Content 64 – escaped with merchant ships

Frigate:

- Castor 26 – escaped with merchant ships

Convoy:

- 250 merchant ships

== Notes, citations and sources ==
=== Sources ===
- Allen, Joseph (1852). Battles of the British Navy. Vol. 1. London: Henry G. Bohn. OCLC 7155299.
- Anderson, M. S. (1995). The War of the Austrian Succession 1740–1748. London: Longman. ISBN 978-0-582-05950-4.
- Black, Jeremy (1998). Britain as a Military Power, 1688–1815. London: Routledge. ISBN 978-1-85728-772-1.
- Borneman, Walter R. (2007). The French and Indian War: Deciding the Fate of North America. New York; Toronto: HarperCollins. ISBN 978-0-06-076184-4.
- Dull, Jonathan R. (2007). The French Navy and the Seven Years' War. Lincoln, Nebraska: University of Nebraska Press. ISBN 978-0-8032-1731-7.
- Lambert, Andrew (2009). Admirals: The Naval Commanders Who Made Britain Great. London: Faber and Faber. ISBN 978-0-571-23157-7.
- Lee, Stephen J. (1984). Aspects of European History, 1494–1789. London: Routledge. ISBN 978-0-416-37490-2.
- Mackay, Ruddock F. (1965). Admiral Hawke. Oxford, United Kingdom: Clarendon Press. OCLC 463252609.
- Pritchard, James (2004). In Search of Empire: The French in the Americas, 1670–1730. Cambridge: Cambridge University Press. ISBN 978-0-521-82742-3.
- Richmond, Herbert W. (2012) [1920]. The Navy in the War of 1739-48. Vol. 3. Cambridge: Cambridge University Press. ISBN 9781107611641.
- Rodger, N.A.M. (1988). The Wooden World: An Anatomy of the Georgian Navy. Annapolis, Maryland: Fontana Press. p. 19. ISBN 978-0-00-686152-2.
- Rodger, N.A.M. (2004). The Command of the Ocean. London: Penguin. ISBN 0-7139-9411-8.
- Sweetman, Jack (1997). The Great Admirals: Command at Sea, 1587–1945. Annapolis: Naval Institute Press. ISBN 978-0-87021-229-1.
- Till, Geoffrey (2006). Development of British Naval Thinking: Essays in Memory of Bryan Ranft. London; New York: Routledge. ISBN 978-0-7146-5320-4.
- Tracy, Nicholas (2010). The Battle of Quiberon Bay, 1759: Hawke and the Defeat of the French Invasion. Barnsley, South Yorkshire: Pen & Sword. ISBN 978-1-84884-116-1.
- Troude, Onesime-Joachim (1867). Batailles navales de la France, Volume 1 (in French). Paris: Libraire Commissionaire de la Marine. OCLC 757299734.
- Tucker, Spencer (2009). A Global Chronology of Conflict: From the Ancient World to the Modern Middle East. Santa Barbara: ABC-CLIO Ltd. ISBN 978-1-85109-667-1.
- Vego, Milan N. (2003). Naval Strategy and Operations in Narrow Seas. London: Frank Cass. ISBN 978-0-7146-5389-1.
- Wilhelm, Thomas (1881). A Military Dictionary and Gazetteer. Philadelphia: L. R. Hamersly & Co. OCLC 1872456.
- Winfield, Rif (2007). British Warships in the Age of Sail 1714–1792. Barnsley, South Yorkshire: Seaforth Publishing. ISBN 978-1-78346-925-3.
