= HMS Monarch (1747) =

Ship of the line of the Royal Navy

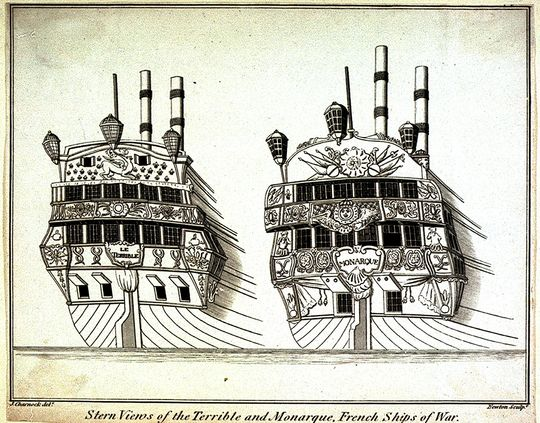
- Drawings of the sterns of two French 74-gun warships captured at Cape Finisterre in October 1747. On the left is Terrible, and on the right, Monarque

History

France
- Name: Monarque
- Builder: Brest
- Laid down: January 1745
- Launched: March 1747
- Completed: July 1747
- Captured: By the Royal Navy on 14 October 1747

Great Britain
- Name: HMS Monarch
- Builder: Brest Dockyard
- Laid down: January 1745
- Launched: March 1747
- Completed: July 1747
- Acquired: 14 October 1747 (by Britain)
- Fate: Sold for breaking up on 25 November 1760

General characteristics
- Class & type: 74-gun third rate ship of the line
- Displacement: 2718 tonneaux
- Tons burthen: 1500 port tonneaux
- Length: 174 ft 10 in (53.3 m) (overall); 149 ft 10 in (45.7 m) (keel)
- Beam: 47 ft 2.5 in (14.4 m)
- Depth of hold: 20 ft 1.5 in (6.13 m)
- Sail plan: Full-rigged ship
- Complement: 650
- Armament: Lower deck: 28 × 32-pdrs; Upper deck: 30 × 18-pdrs; Quarterdeck: 10 × 9-pdrs; Forecastle: 6 × 9-pdrs

HMS Monarch was originally the 74-gun ship of the line Monarque of the French Navy launched in March 1747. Captured on 14 October 1747, she was taken into Royal Navy service as the third rate HMS Monarch.

Monarque was built during the War of the Austrian Succession at Brest to a design by Blaise Ollivier, but lasted only a few months in French service. She was captured by the British just three months after being completed, one of several prizes taken by Sir Edward Hawke's fleet at the Battle of Cape Finisterre. Brought into the Royal Navy, she was used for the rest of the War of the Austrian Succession as a guardship and to carry troops. She saw service during the Seven Years' War, forming part of fleets sent to North America and the Mediterranean under Hawke, Boscawen and Osborn, and being commanded at one stage by future admiral George Rodney.

Monarch was the scene of the execution of Admiral Sir John Byng, who had been sentenced to death for failing to do his utmost during the Battle of Minorca (1756), and was shot on Monarch's quarterdeck on 14 March 1757. Monarch went out to the Mediterranean during the last years of the Seven Years' War, and played a role in the British victory at the Battle of Cartagena. She returned home and was reduced to harbour service, and was sold for breaking up in 1760.

== Construction and capture ==
Monarque was laid down at Brest in January 1745, and was built to a design by Blaise Ollivier. On Ollivier's death in October 1746, work on the ship was completed by Luc Coulomb. She was launched in March 1747, and was completed by July that year. Her career with the French was short-lived. She joined the fleet under Admiral Desherbiers de l'Etenduère in October 1747, with orders to escort a convoy across the Atlantic. The French were brought to battle off Cape Finisterre by a fleet under Admiral Sir Edward Hawke, and Monarque was one of the ships captured in the resulting defeat for the French, at the Battle of Cape Finisterre.

== British career ==
Monarque was towed into Portsmouth and was surveyed there in July 1748. The Navy Board authorised her purchase for the navy on 30 September 1748, paying the sum of £17,555.16.8d, having deducted a sum for repairs. A small repair was carried out and she was fitted for service between December 1748 and March 1749. Monarch commissioned for service in December 1748 under the command of Captain Robert Harland, and became the guardship at Portsmouth. She passed to Captain John Amherst in 1751, still serving as the Portsmouth guardship, but returned to sea later that year to carry troops to Menorca. She was paid off in November 1752, and fitted for continued service as a guardship the following year. She recommissioned as the Portsmouth guardship in January 1753 under Captain Roger Martin, and was again involved in trooping duties, this time Gibraltar in 1754. She passed under Captain Henry Harrison in 1754, followed by Captain Abraham North in 1755. Monarch became the flagship of Rear-Admiral Savage Mostyn, and sailed for North America in April 1755.

Monarch joined Vice-Admiral Edward Boscawen's squadron in North America, with Captain North being succeeded by Captain George Rodney in 1756. Monarch joined Henry Osborn's fleet in January 1756, and served with Sir Edward Hawke from March that year. By 1757 she was back in Portsmouth, during the court martial of Admiral Sir John Byng.

=== Byng's execution ===
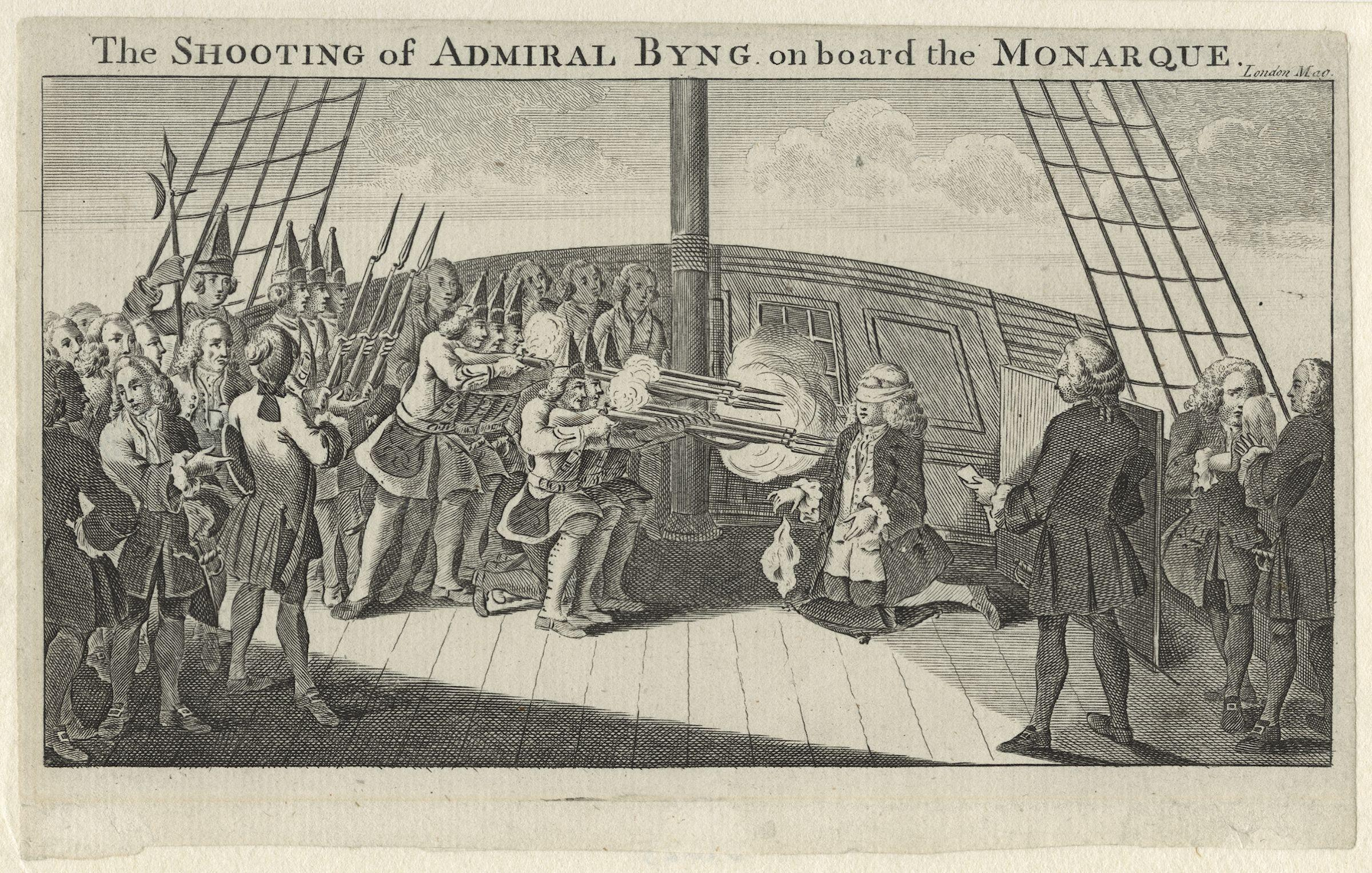
The Shooting of Admiral Byng, by unknown artist

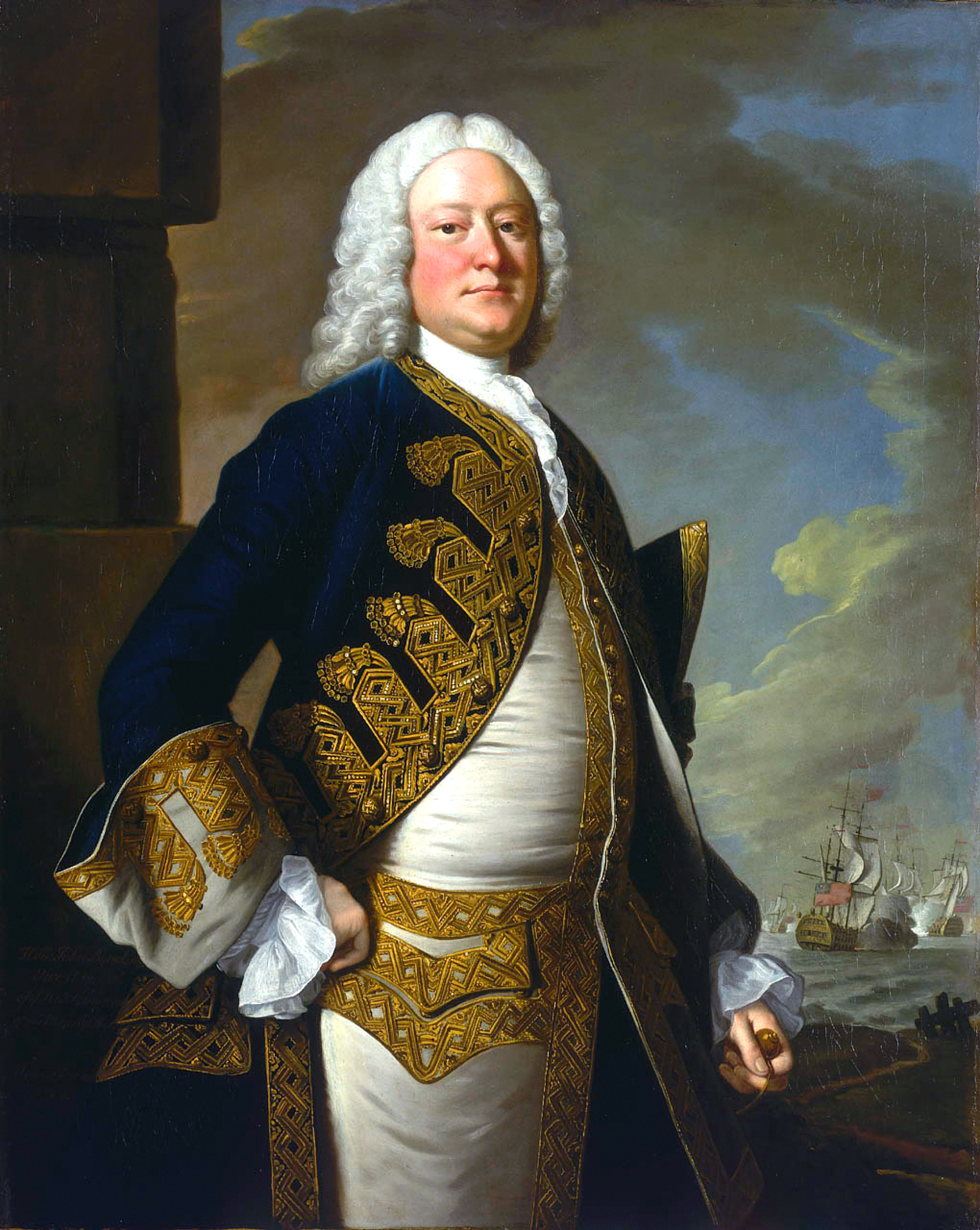
Portrait of Admiral Byng by Thomas Hudson, 1749

Admiral Byng had commanded the British fleet sent to relieve Menorca in 1756, but after a brief and indecisive engagement, he drew off and allowed the island to fall to the French. Incensed, the British public demanded an investigation. Byng was arrested, and tried by court martial for having breached the Articles of War. Though Byng was acquitted of cowardice or disaffection, he was found guilty of failing to do his utmost, which carried a mandatory death sentence. Byng was brought aboard Monarch, which by then was anchored at Portsmouth under Captain John Montagu. Montagu recorded in the ship's log for 14 March 1757:

These 24 hours very squally, with showers of wind and rain; Admiral Byng's Co. as before; at 7 A.M. his Coffin came on board; at 10 A.M. all the Ships' Boats, manned and armed, came to attend his Execution; hard gales, lowered down the lower yards: at noon all hands were called up to attend his execution; he was shot on the larboard side of the Quarter Deck by six Marines, attended by Lieut. Clark, the Marshal, and Mr. Muckings; these gentlemen went ashore after the execution was over.

=== Action with the French ===
Monarch went out to the Mediterranean in May 1757, and joined Henry Osborn's fleet. She was present with the fleet at the Battle of Cartagena on 28 February 1758, where Osborn defeated an attempt by a French squadron under Michel-Ange Duquesne de Menneville to relieve the French fleet under Jean-François de La Clue-Sabran which had been trapped in Cartagena. Together Monarch and HMS Montagu drove ashore the 64-gun Oriflamme.

Monarch was recommissioned in July 1759 under Captain Lachlin Leslie, but spent her time on harbour service and was paid off in September 1760. She was surveyed on 24 October 1760, but was not repaired and instead was sold at Woolwich on 25 November that year for the sum of £1,065, equal to £177,946 today.

== See also ==
- List of ships captured in the 18th century
