= Western Squadron =

- Active: origin,1650-1690 formally established 1746-1854
- Country: United Kingdom
- Branch: Royal Navy
- Type: Squadron
- Role: Blockade; Patrol; Trade Protection
- Garrison/HQ: Plymouth Dockyard, England
- Engagements: First Battle of Cape Finisterre (1747); Second Battle of Cape Finisterre (1747); Battle of Quiberon Bay; Battle of Ushant (1778)

Commanders
- Notable commanders: Admiral Edward Hawke

The Western Squadron was a squadron or formation of the Royal Navy based at Plymouth Dockyard. It operated in waters of the English Channel, the Western Approaches, and the North Atlantic. It defended British trade sea lanes from 1650 to 1814 and 1831 to 1854. Following Admiralty orders to Lord Anson he was instructed to combine all existing commands in the English Channel - those at the Downs, Narrow Seas, Plymouth and the Spithead - under a centralized command under the Commander-in-Chief, Western Squadron in 1746. The squadron was commanded by the Flag Officer with the dual title of Commander-in-Chief, English Channel and Commander-in-Chief, Western Squadron

== History ==
In 1650 Captain William Penn, was charged with guarding the Channel from Beachy Head to Land's End with six ships. This system continued following the Restoration. It was the start of what was to become a Western Squadron. In 1690 the Edward Russell, 1st Earl of Orford was given command of a fleet in the channel. From 1705 until the 1740s it was essentially Cruising Squadron before it changed to blockading duties. In 1746 the Admiralty authorised Admiral Anson to combine all the Channel commands into the Western Squadron, based in Plymouth. During the Seven Years' War (1756-1763) the Western Squadron was one of Britain’s most critical military assets frequently patrolling the entrance to the English Channel and making regular sweeps into the Bay of Biscay and the waters off Ushant. One of its responsibilities was trade protection ensuring the safe return of inbound trade from the East Indies and West Indies. The squadron was involved at the Second Battle of Cape Finisterre (1747), the Battle of Quiberon Bay (1756), and the Battle of Ushant (1778). By 1801 its main role was still to stop French ships from French naval bases at Brest, Le Havre and elsewhere in the Bay of Biscay from entering the English Channel. The Western Squadron was the forerunner of the Channel Squadron that was later known as the Channel Fleet.

== Influence on British naval policy, strategy and thinking ==
In the seventeen hundreds, British Naval policy had not changed very much in previous centuries. With British trade interests growing, however, so were the problems posed by French Naval expansion since the 1660s-1670s, along with the need to resolve them. English War planners were constantly dealing with the threat of war with France but no strategy had been put in place to provide sufficient infrastructure to meet these challenges. The majority of the navy’s manufacturing capacity and dry-docking facilities were concentrated on the South East coast which had expanded to meet the demands faced by the Anglo-Dutch wars. In 1689 when war with France eventually came the only dry dock facility in the channel was located at Portsmouth. In 1692 the main focus of naval activity shifted to west because the French moved their primary fleet to Brest. In 1698 the Admiralty authorised a complete new dockyard be built at Plymouth housing a dry dock and wet dock. Having both of these facilities allowed Western Squadron to grow fast and by the early 1740s it had become the navy's main battle fleet. The British were concerned with maintaining control of their own sea lanes – particularly the English Channel - while restricting the activities, both military and economic, of their rivals and foes. In 1747 Admiral Hawke suggested the squadron should be used for containment purposes and developed the idea that it keep an almost continual watch on the French Navy and French coast. This was agreed by the Admiralty and the naval blockade developed as a consequence of this policy. During the 1759 blockade of Brest, Admiral Hawke was the first to establish a system of replenishment at sea in order to maintain a blockade.

== Commanders ==
Incomplete list of post holders included:
No = died in post

- Vice Admiral Lord Anson (1746– 3 May 1747)
- Rear-Admiral Sir Peter Warren (7 July 1747 – 3 August 1747)
- Admiral Sir Edward Hawke, (3 August 1747 – 1748)
- Admiral Sir Edward Hawke, (1755- June 1756)
- Admiral John Byng, (1755-1756)
- Vice Admiral Lord Anson (1757– October 1758)
- Vice-Admiral Sir Charles Saunders, (October 1758-9 May 1759)
- Admiral Sir Edward Hawke, (9 May 1759 – 4 January 1763)
- Admiral Augustus Keppel (22 March 1778– 18 March 1779)
- Admiral Charles Hardy (18 March 1779 – 1780) No
- Admiral Sir Francis Geary (May 1780-September 1780)
- Vice Admiral George Darby (1780–1782)
- Admiral Earl Howe (1782–1783)
- Commodore Sir John Lindsay, (1783–84)
- Commodore John Leveson-Gower, (1785–88)
- Admiral Earl Howe, (1790)
- Admiral Earl Howe, (June 1793 – April 1794)
- Admiral Sir John Borlase Warren, (July 1793 - April 1794)
- Admiral Edward Pellew, (April 1794 -1795)
- Admiral Lord Bridport, (1795–1797) (temporary command)
- Admiral Lord Bridport, (1797–1800)
- Admiral Lord St Vincent, (1800–1803)
- Admiral Sir William Cornwallis, (1803–1806)
- Admiral Lord Gardner, (1807–1808)
- Admiral Lord St Vincent, (1806–1807)
- Admiral Lord Gardner, (1807–1809) No
- Admiral Lord Gambier, (1809–1811)
- Admiral Sir Charles Cotton, (1811–1812) No
- Admiral Lord Keith, (1812–1814)

Squadron disbanded, (1815-1830)

- 1831-32 Vice-Admiral Sir Edward Codrington, (1831-1832)

Squadron disbanded, (1833-1845)

- Commodore Sir Francis Collier, (1846)
- Vice-Admiral Sir William Parker, (1846-1847)
- Rear-Admiral Sir Charles Napier, (1847-1849)
- Rear-Admiral, Armar Lowry Corry, (1852-1854)

Squadron is disbanded but is re-established under a new name the Channel Squadron in 1858.
