= William Death =

Captain William Death was an 18th-century privateer from Middlesex, England who died in battle in December 1756, in the first year of the Seven Years' War.

Captain Death was in command of the Terrible, a ship equipped with twenty-six carriage guns, and manned with 200 sailors. On 23 December 1756, the Terrible engaged the Alexandre le Grande, a large French ship sailing from Saint-Domingue. The Alexandre le Grande was captured, but 4th Lieutenant John Death, Captain Death's brother, died in battle, and 16 other men were lost. Captain Death assigned 40 men to secure the French ship, and they made for Plymouth, England.

As the ships entered the English Channel on 27 December, they met the French Vengeance, a privateer from Saint-Malo, with 36 large cannon and 360 men. The Vengeance sailed towards the Terrible under an English ensign, but hoisted the French colours when she came near, sailing between the faster Terrible and the slower Alexandre le Grande. The French retook the Alexandre and doubled up on the Terrible, which lost her main-mast in the first broadside. When the battle ended, the French commander, his second in command, and 2/3 of his company were lost. The French boarded the Terrible and found only 26 men alive, 16 of whom were severely wounded. John Withy, the 3rd Lieutenant of the Terrible and a survivor of the battle, claimed that Captain Death initially survived the battle, but was shot after he had struck the colours. His body was tossed into the sea.

The badly damaged Terrible was towed to Saint-Malo. When word of the battle reached England, funds were raised for William Death's widow, as well as the survivors. Captain Death's battles against the French were cited as examples of English courage against superior odds.

A young Thomas Paine had intended to join Captain Death's crew, but was dissuaded by his father. In his 1776 pamphlet Common Sense, Paine cited Captain Death's battles in his argument that the American colonies should raise a naval fleet. An English folk ballad titled "Captain Death" was printed as early as 1783, and laments the loss of the "brave Captain Death."

It is said that the Terrible was equipped at Execution Dock, commanded by Captain Death, Lieutenant Devil, and had a surgeon named Ghost.

== In popular culture ==
Perhaps coincidentally, a recurring Golden Age Captain Marvel supervillain is also named Captain Death. The character, a captain of a gigantic submarine, engaged in kidnapping, smuggling and piracy.
