= HMS Gloucester (1745) =

Ship of the line of the Royal Navy

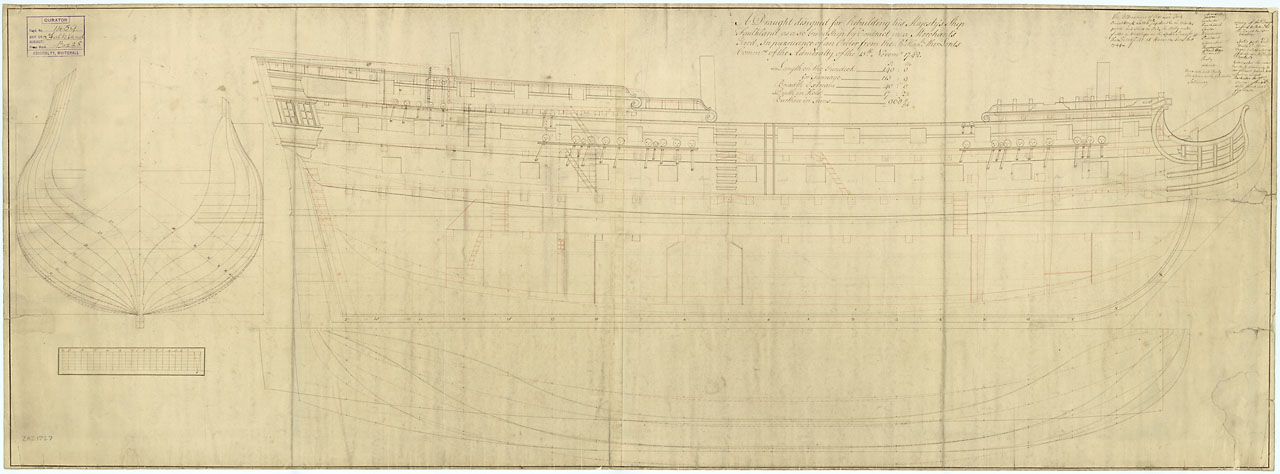
- Gloucester

History

Great Britain
- Name: Gloucester
- Namesake: Gloucester
- Ordered: 15 June 1743
- Builder: Whetstone & Grenville, Rotherhithe
- Laid down: 12 July 1743
- Launched: 23 March 1745
- Completed: 10 May 1745
- Commissioned: March 1745
- Honours and awards: Second Battle of Cape Finisterre, 1747
- Fate: Broken up, 13 February 1764

General characteristics
- Class & type: 1741 revisions 50-gun fourth rate ship of the line
- Tons burthen: 985 67/94 bm
- Length: 140 ft 8.5 in (42.9 m) (Gundeck)
- Beam: 40 ft 2.5 in (12.3 m)
- Depth of hold: 17 ft 2.5 in (5.2 m)
- Sail plan: Full-rigged ship
- Complement: 300
- Armament: 50 guns: Gundeck: 22 × 24-pdr cannon; Upper gundeck: 22 × 12-pdr cannon; Quarterdeck: 4 × 6-pdr cannon; Forecastle: 2 × 6-pdr cannon

HMS Gloucester was a 50-gun fourth rate ship of the line built for the Royal Navy in the 1740s. She participated in the 1740–48 War of the Austrian Succession, capturing four French privateers. The ship was broken up in 1764.

== Description ==
Gloucester had a length at the gundeck of 140 feet 8.5 inches (42.9 m) and 114 feet 7.5 inches (34.9 m) at the keel. She had a beam of 40 feet 2.5 inches (12.3 m) and a depth of hold of 17 feet 2.5 inches (5.2 m). The ship's tonnage was 89567/94 tons burthen. Gloucester was armed with twenty-two 24-pounder cannon on her main gundeck, twenty-two 12-pounder cannon on her upper gundeck, four 6-pounder cannon on the quarterdeck and another pair on the forecastle. The ship had a crew of 300 officers and ratings.

== Construction and career ==
Gloucester, named after the eponymous port, was the fifth ship of her name to serve in the Royal Navy. She was ordered on 15 June 1743 from Whetstone & Grenville, to the 1741 revisions of dimensions. The ship was laid down at their Rotherhithe dockyard on 12 July, launched on 23 March 1745 and completed on 10 May. Gloucester cost £13,019 to build and an additional £6,149 to outfit. The ship was commissioned in March 1745 under Captain Charles Saunders for service in the English Channel. She took two French privateers in July and another pair in 1747. Later that year she participated in the Second Battle of Cape Finisterre on 25 October. Gloucester sailed for Jamaica in 1749 and returned home in 1753 to pay off.

She briefly served as a hospital ship for sick soldiers in 1758 before the ship was transferred to Sheerness for use as a receiving ship the following year. Gloucester was ordered to be broken up on 21 October 1763 which was completed by 13 February 1764.
