= Henri-François des Herbiers, Marquis de l'Estenduère =

French naval officer (1682–1750)

Henri-François des Herbiers
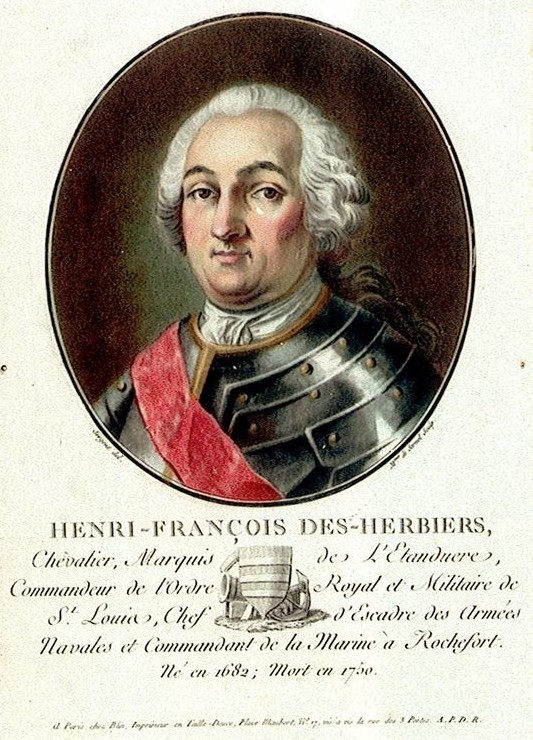
- Born: 1682; Angers, France
- Died: March 1750 (aged 67–68); Rochefort, France
- Other name: Marquis de l'Estenduère
- Occupation: Chef d'escadre

Henri-François des Herbiers, Marquis de L'Estenduère, was born in Angers, Province of Anjou, around 1682 and died in Rochefort in March 1750. He was a Navy officer and aristocrat in France. Coming from a noble family from Poitou, he began his navigational training under the direction of his uncle, and began his naval career at an early age in the Marine royale. He distinguished himself for the first time during the War of the Spanish Succession near Vélez-Málaga and then at the Battle of Marbella, before fighting as a privateer. During the 1720s, he undertook many voyages to New France and drew many marine maps of the St. Lawrence River. He took part in the wars of the Polish Succession, and the War of the Spanish Succession.

In 1747, he accomplished his greatest feat at the Battle of Cape Finisterre along the Spanish coast of Galicia. In charge of escorting a merchant convoy to the West Indies with eight ships, he was attacked on 25 October by 14 British ships of Admiral Edward Hawke, and sustained more than seven hours of fierce combat. Six French vessels were captured, but the convoy was almost totally saved. He also managed to avoid being captured when his ship, Le Tonnant with (80 cannons) was partially disabled. His second in command, marquis de Vaudreuil, on the Intrépide (74 cannon vessel), turned around and traversed British lines, and towed the ship back to Brest during the night. He ended his career as chef d'escadre.

== See also ==
- History of the French Navy
- Second Battle of Cape Finisterre (1747)
