= HMS Norwich (1745) =

Ship of the line of the Royal Navy

History

Great Britain
- Name: HMS Norwich
- Ordered: 30 September 1743
- Builder: Perry, Blackwall Yard
- Launched: 4 July 1745
- Fate: Sold, 1768

General characteristics
- Class & type: 1741 proposals 50-gun fourth rate ship of the line
- Tons burthen: 993
- Length: 140 ft (42.7 m) (gundeck)
- Beam: 40 ft (12.2 m)
- Depth of hold: 17 ft 2 1/2 in (5.2 m)
- Propulsion: Sails
- Sail plan: Full-rigged ship
- Armament: 50 guns: Gundeck: 22 × 24 pdrs; Upper gundeck: 22 × 12 pdrs; Quarterdeck: 4 × 6 pdrs; Forecastle: 2 × 6 pdrs

HMS Norwich was a 50-gun fourth rate ship of the line of the Royal Navy, built according to the 1741 proposals of the 1719 Establishment at Blackwall Yard, and launched on 4 July 1745.

Norwich served until 1768, when she was sold out of the navy.
