= HMS Devonshire (1745) =

Ship of the line of the Royal Navy

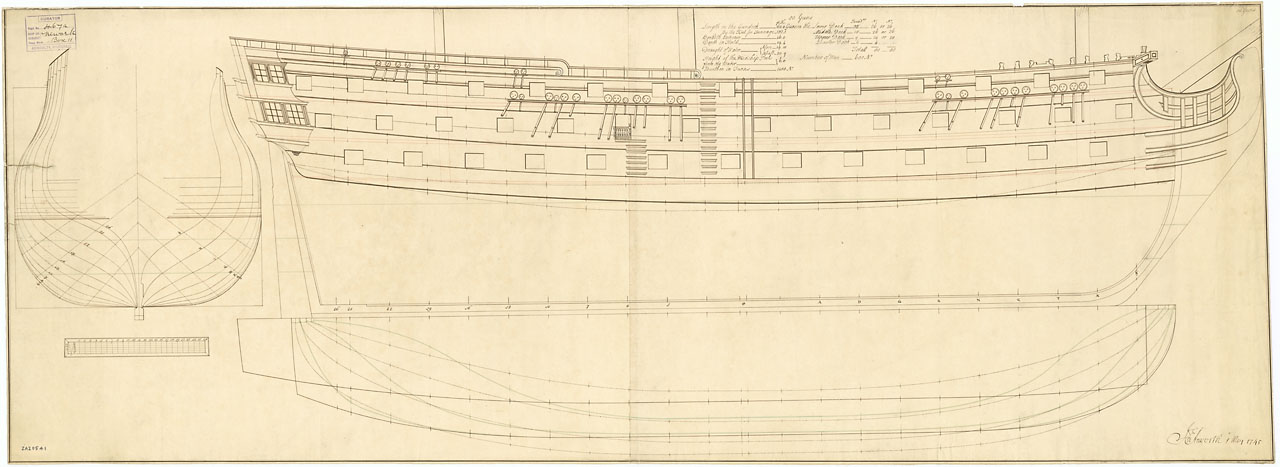
- 1745 plan of the Devonshire

History

Great Britain
- Name: HMS Devonshire
- Ordered: 25 April 1741
- Builder: Woolwich Dockyard
- Launched: 19 July 1745
- Honours and awards: Second Battle of Cape Finisterre, 1747
- Fate: Broken up, 1772

General characteristics
- Class & type: 1741 proposals 66-gun third rate ship of the line
- Length: 161 ft (49.1 m) (gundeck)
- Beam: 46 ft (14.0 m)
- Depth of hold: 19 ft 4 in (5.9 m)
- Propulsion: Sails
- Sail plan: Full-rigged ship
- Armament: 66 guns: Gundeck: 26 × 32 pdrs; Upper gundeck: 26 × 18 pdrs; Quarterdeck: 10 × 9 pdrs; Forecastle: 2 × 9 pdrs

HMS Devonshire was a 66-gun third rate ship of the line of the Royal Navy, built to the dimensions laid out in the 1741 proposals of the 1719 Establishment at Woolwich Dockyard, and launched on 19 July 1745.

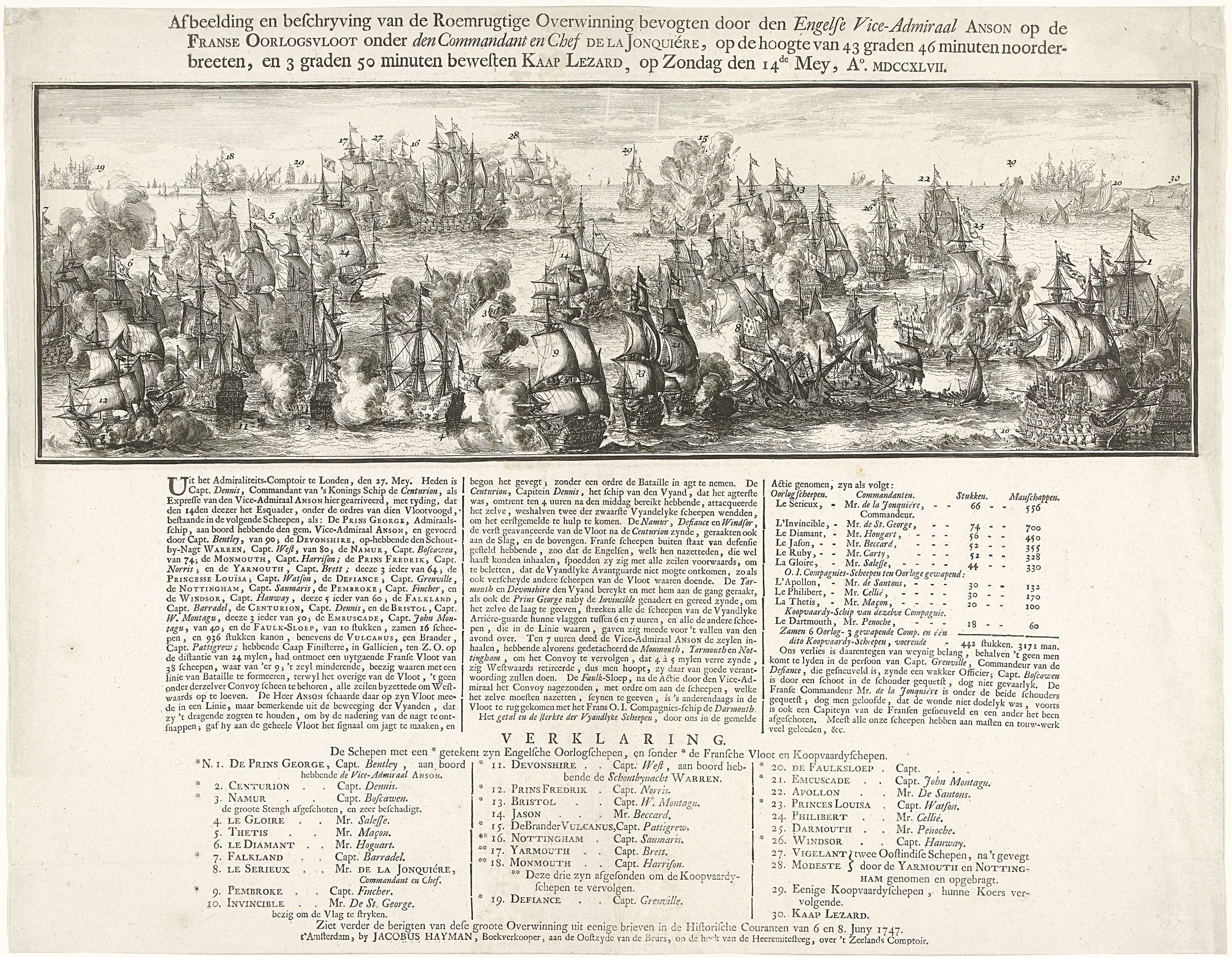
Devonshire shown here at the First Battle of Cape Finisterre (1747)

Devonshire served until 1772, when she was broken up.
