= French ship Content (1747) =

Ship of the line of the French Navy

History

France
- Name: Content
- Builder: Toulon
- Laid down: January 1746
- Launched: 12 February 1747
- Commissioned: December 1747
- Fate: Captured and burned December 1793

General characteristics
- Type: Third-rate ship of the line
- Displacement: 2100 tonneaux
- Tons burthen: 1180 port tonneaux
- Length: 47.4 m (155 ft 6 in)
- Beam: 13.0 m (42 ft 8 in)
- Draught: 6.2 m (20 ft 4 in)
- Crew: 446
- Armament: 64 guns

Content was a third-rate ship of the line of the French Royal Navy, designed by Joseph Véronique Charles Chapelle.

Content was captured and burned in 1793.
