= Louis-Philippe de Rigaud, Marquis of Vaudreuil =

French naval officer (1691-1763)

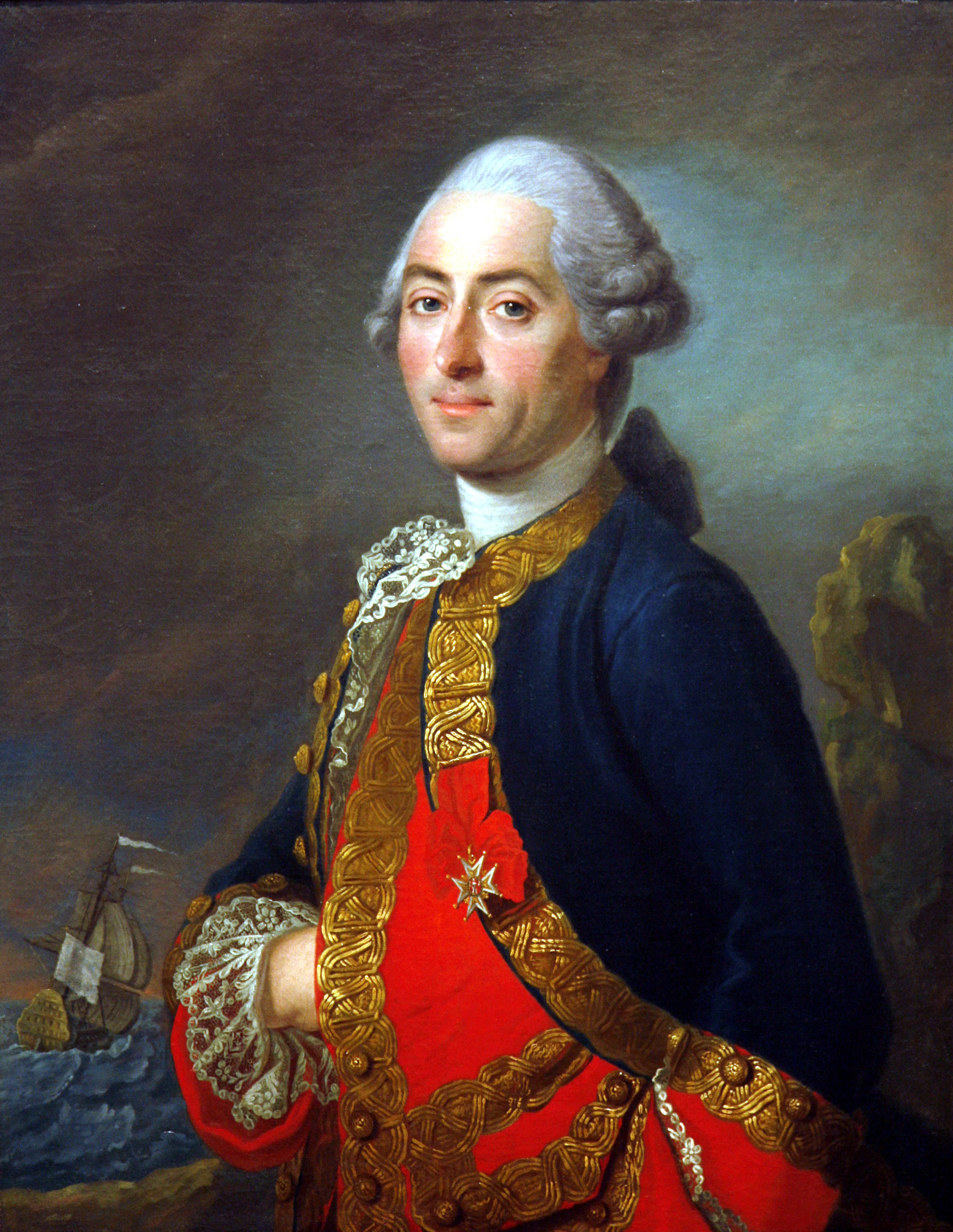
Vaudreuil at the Battle of Cap Finisterre

Louis-Philippe de Rigaud, Marquis of Vaudreuil (Quebec City, 22 September 1691 – Rochefort, 27 November 1763) was a French naval officer.

== Bibliography ==
Vaudreuil served in Canada where his father, Philippe de Rigaud, Marquis de Vaudreuil, was governor from 1703 to 1725, and came back to France only after the death of his father in (1725). Promoted to Captain in 1738, was given command of Intrépide, which he captained at the Second Battle of Cape Finisterre on 25 October 1747, North of Cape Finisterre. Louis XV had a tablet made representing the Intrépide battling the English fleet, and donated it to Vaudreuil. A copy is on display at Versailles Museum. Vaudreuil was promoted chef d'escadre and to lieutenant général des armées navales in 1753. He died in 1763.

== Marriage and children ==
He married on 22 December 1723 with Élisabeth-Catherine Le Moyne, daughter of Joseph Le Moyne de Sérigny. They had

- Louis-Philippe de Rigaud de Vaudreuil (1724–1802), second in command of the French Navy during the American Revolutionary War.
- Louise Élisabeth Charlotte de Rigaud de Vaudreuil (1725–1806)
- Louis de Rigaud de Vaudreuil (1728–1810), fought also in the American Revolutionary War.

== Notes, citations, and references ==
Notes

Citations

Bibliography

- Taillemite, Étienne (2002). Dictionnaire des Marins français. Tallandier. ISBN 2-84734-008-4. OCLC 606770323.
