= Holburn (surname) =

Holburn is a surname. Notable people with the surname include:

- Sir Alexander Holburn, 3rd Baronet (died 1772), Scottish naval officer
- Bob Holburn, Canadian football player
- James Holburn (disambiguation), several people
- John Goundry Holburn (1843–1899), Scottish politician
- Holburn Baronets
