= Menstrie Castle =

Manor house in Scotland

Coordinates: 56°8′58.58″N 3°51′7.79″W

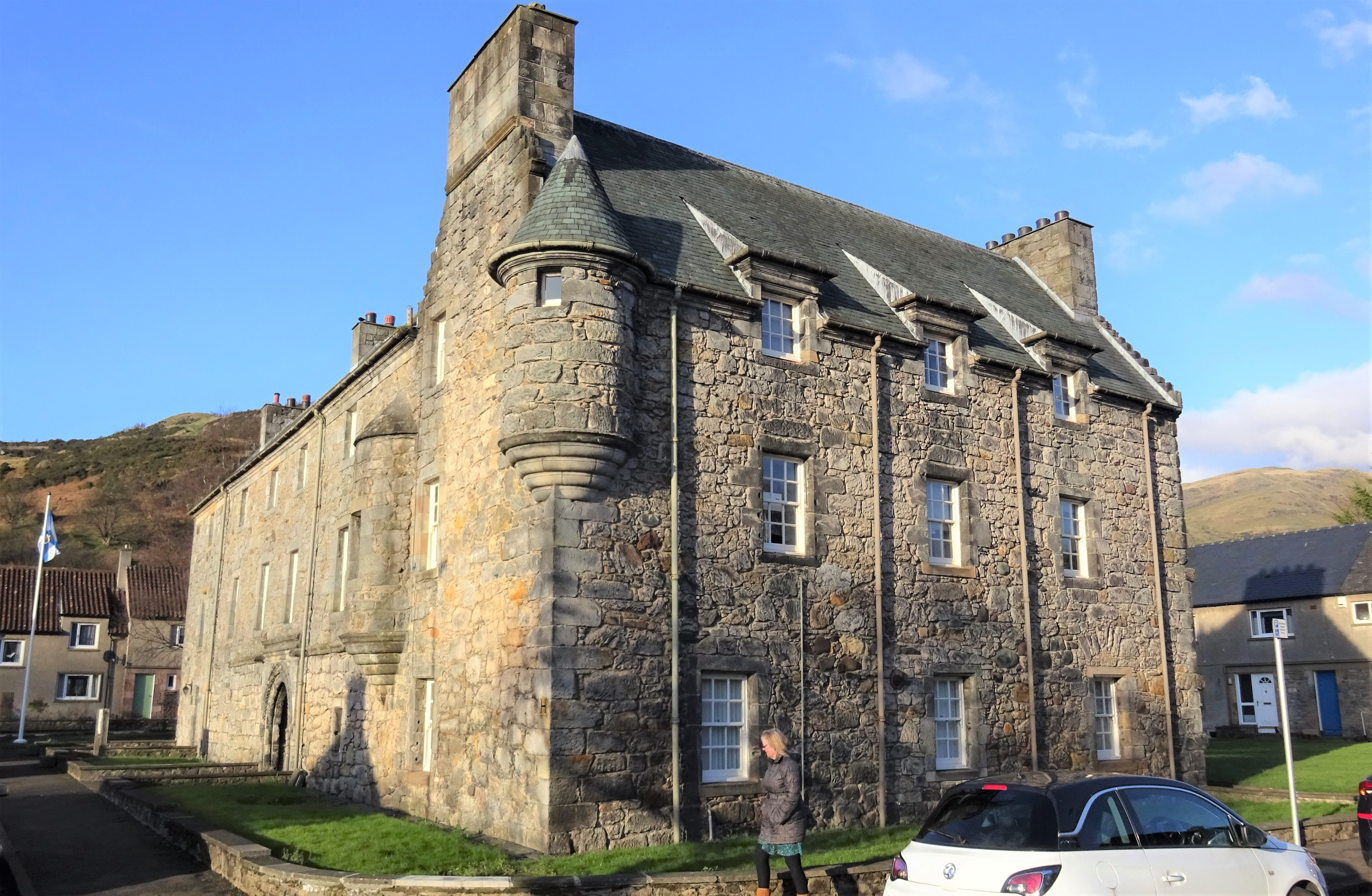
- The castle in 2022
- Established: 1560
- Location: Menstrie, Scotland

Menstrie Castle is a three-storey manor house in the town of Menstrie, Clackmannanshire, near Stirling, central Scotland. From the early 17th century, it was home to Sir William Alexander, 1st Earl of Stirling, who was instrumental in founding the colony of Nova Scotia. It was later owned by the Holburn or Holborne family, who were created Baronets of Menstrie in 1706. The castle was restored in the 20th century, won a Civic Trust award, and now incorporates holiday accommodation, private flats and museum. The museum previously opened 2 days a week by the National Trust for Scotland. is now open by request through the Menstrie Community Council.

== History ==
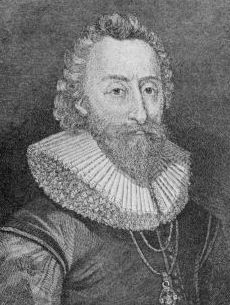
William Alexander, Earl of Stirling

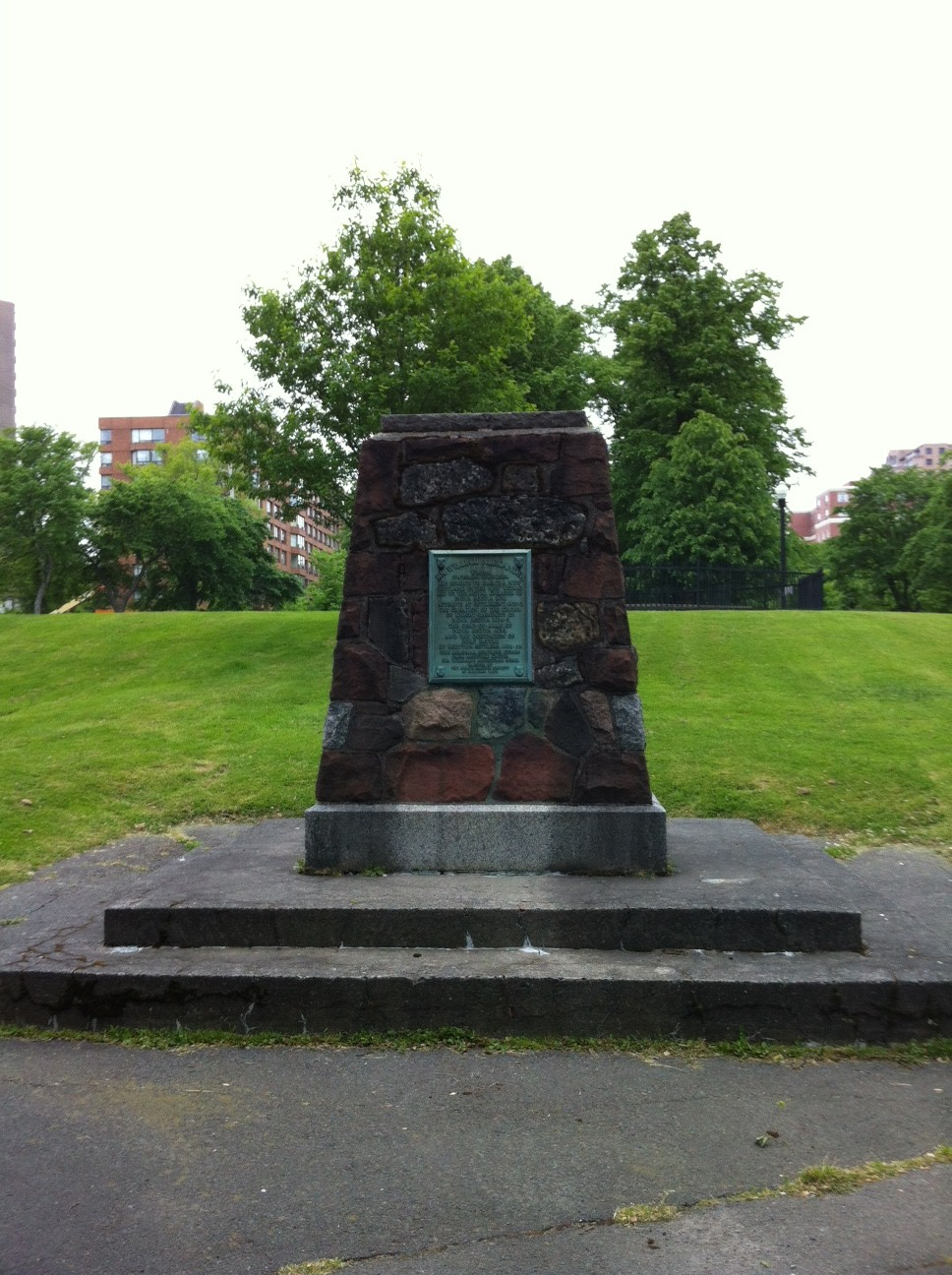
William Alexander Monument, built of stones from his Menstrie Castle, Victoria Park, Halifax, Nova Scotia (1957)

=== Alexander family ===
The castle was built around 1560 by the Alexander family, a sept of the Clan MacAlister, who had anglicised their surname. Sir William Alexander was born here around 1577, and later became known as a poet. He gained a place in the Royal Household of James VI, eventually becoming a member of the Privy Council of Scotland in 1615, Principal Secretary of State in 1626, and Earl of Stirling in 1633.

In 1621, William Stirling was appointed governor of Nova Scotia, an area of North America including the modern Canadian provinces of Nova Scotia and New Brunswick, and the Gaspé Peninsula. In order to populate his territory, the Baronetage of Nova Scotia was devised in 1624, whereby baronetcies were sold to support colonists. The scheme was a financial failure, and in 1632 Nova Scotia was returned to the French, who had claimed the area originally. Alexander, Earl of Stirling, died bankrupt in London in 1644.

=== Holborne family ===
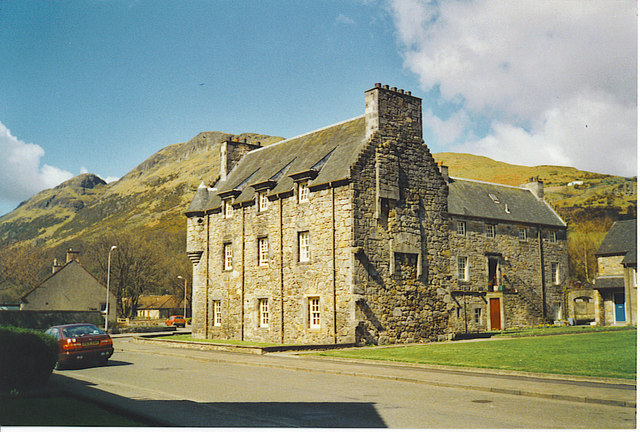
Menstrie Castle in 2001, with the Ochils behind

Menstrie Castle was burned by the Royalist James Graham, 1st Marquess of Montrose in 1645, during the English Civil War. It was sold to James Holborne of Menstrie in 1648. A major general in the Scottish army, Holborne had a chequered career during the Wars of the Three Kingdoms. An additional property, named Windsor House, and now demolished, was once situated opposite Menstrie Castle, to serve as a second laird's house. In 1719, most of the Menstrie estate was sold on, but the Holborne family kept the smaller house, probably as a dower house. A stone heraldic panel, from over the door of the demolished house, was preserved, and later built into the gable-end of the residential home now standing on the site. The motto DECUS MEUM VIRTUS ("Beware / Honour my Virtue / Valor / Strength") is still legible, but differs from the motto on the Holborne family crest (Decus Summum Virtus, translated as "Honour the Supreme Power"). The last surviving heir of the Holborne family of Menstrie was a Miss Mary Anne Holborne of Bath, daughter of Francis, 4th Baronet, who left an endowment of £8,000 in 1882, for the church of Menstrie.

=== Later history ===
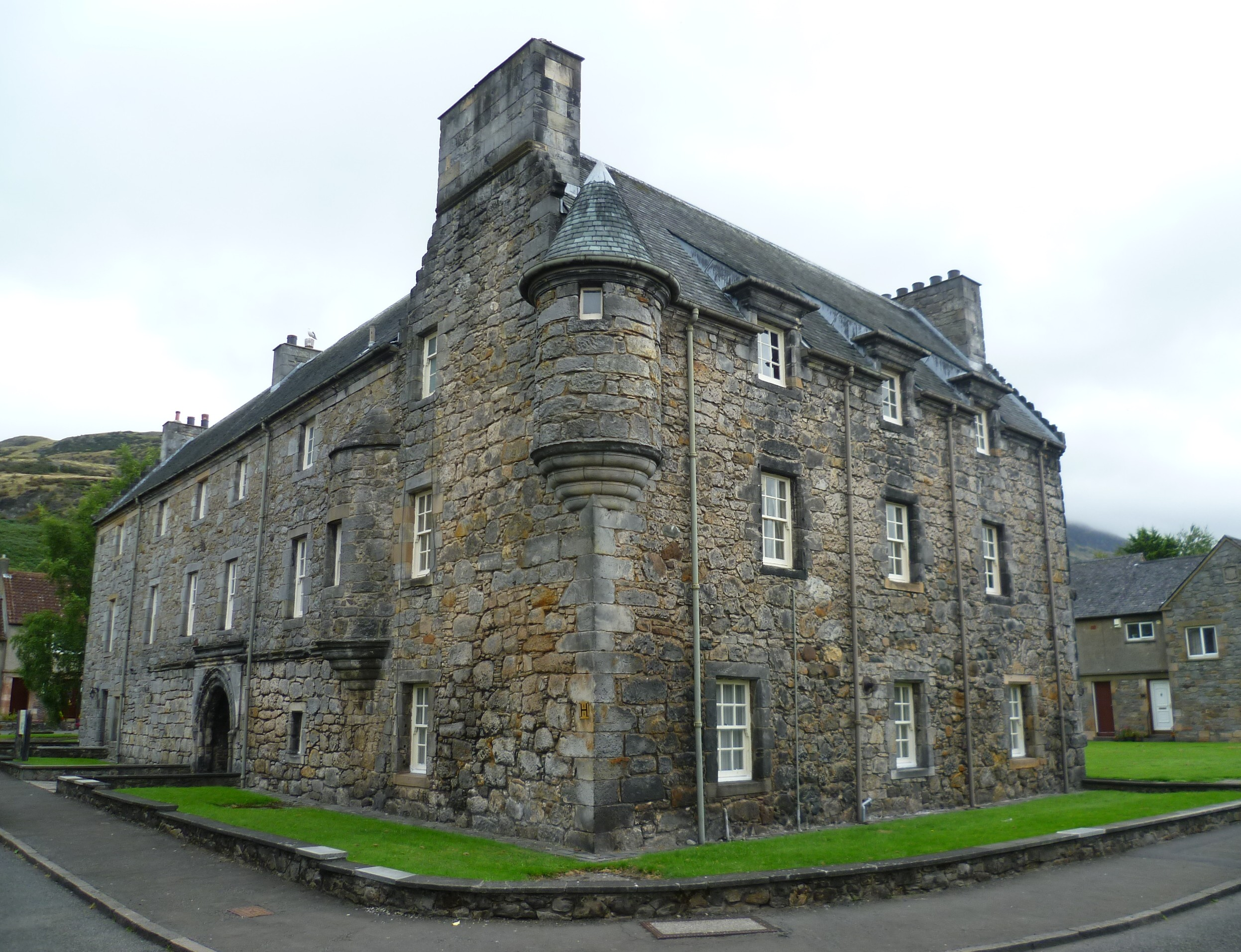
Menstrie Castle

The castle was purchased by George Abercromby of Tullibody House in 1719, and his family held the estate until 1924, although the buildings had begun to deteriorate from around 1750. George's son, Ralph Abercromby, who became a major British military hero, was born here in 1734. From around 1740, the castle was only used for summer use and the family relocated to Tullibody House each winter, and the castle was allowed to decay somewhat. In both 1752 and 1753, the house was occupied during the summer during the visits of John Ramsay of Ochtertyre who was a friend of Ralph.

By the end of the Second World War, the castle was in such disrepair that the Scottish actor and conservationist, Moultrie Kelsall, led a campaign to secure funding and protection to aid its restoration.

In 1960, the Castle was listed Category A, as a building of national importance (but only receiving statutory protection in December 1970).

== Restoration ==
In March 1957 actor and presenter Moultrie Kelsall began a campaign to raise funds to restore the building.

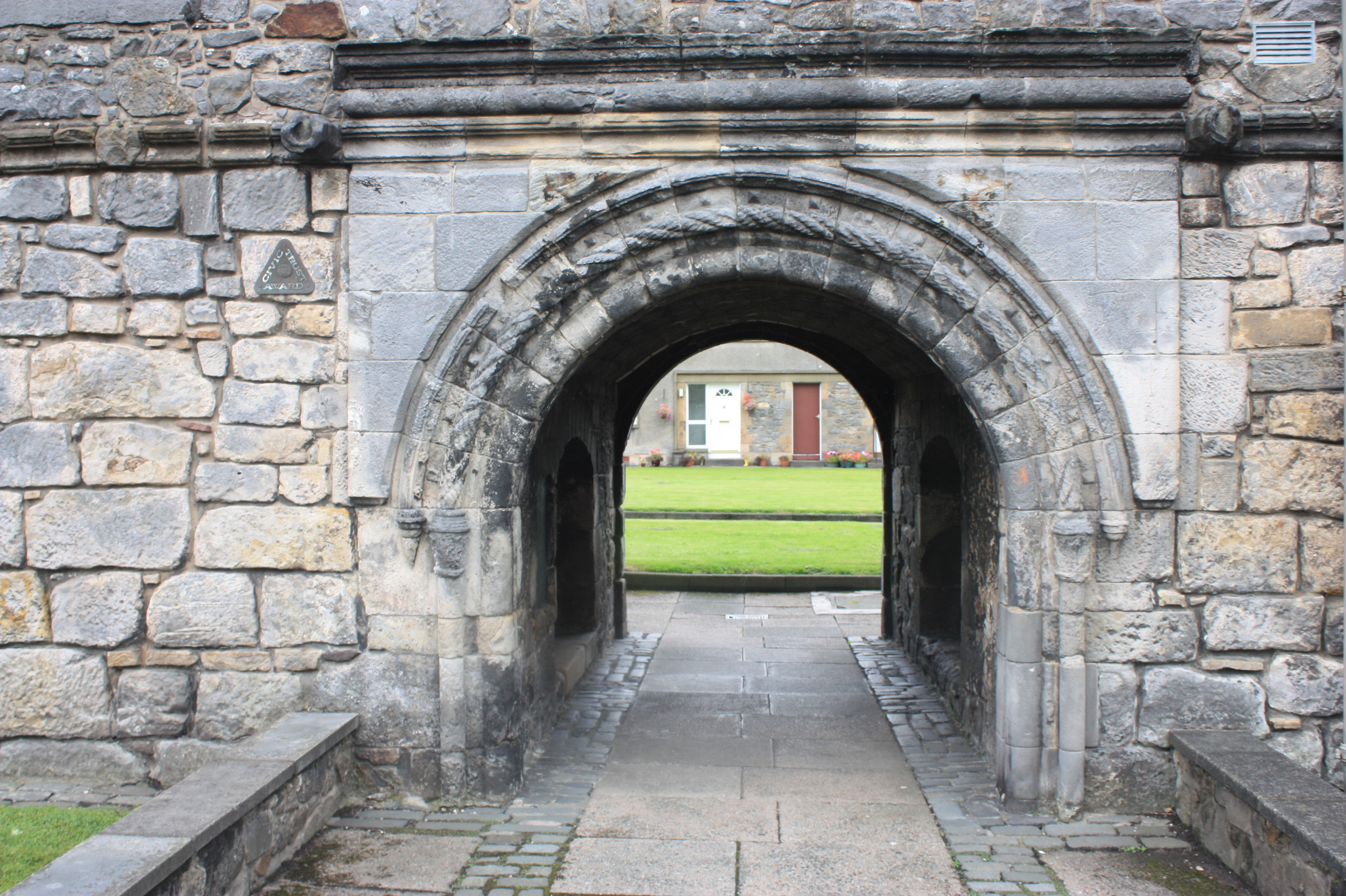
16th century entrance arch, Menstrie Castle

The building was restored by Clackmannanshire County Council, under the guidance of county architect William Higgins Henry (1905-1984), winning a Scottish Civic Trust award for restoration in 1962 (plaqued). The building was converted into four flats and a courtyard of new houses created to the east side. By 1964 the restoration was completed.

The restoration retained the fine 16th-century entrance arch, but replaced stone on the ground floor either side of this arch.

The eastern gable has fireplaces in it where a 17th-century extension was demolished.

The National Trust for Scotland care for the two ground floor flats and it is open to the public (on a restricted basis by appointment).

== The castle ==
Originally a small, L-plan tower house, the castle was extended in the 17th century into a U-plan house. A section of curtain wall closes the U, forming a courtyard. Two rooms within the castle are occupied by an exhibition commemorating the link between Menstrie, William Alexander, and Nova Scotia. One of the rooms is decorated with the arms of all the Baronets of Nova Scotia. These rooms are managed by the National Trust for Scotland. with Menstrie Community Council a key holder

You can also stay overnight in Menstrie Castle. Two of the rooms have been converted into self-catering accommodation.
