= Holborne =

Holborne is a surname. Notable people with the surname include:

- Anthony Holborne (1545–1602), composer of English consort music during the reign of Queen Elizabeth I
- James Holborne of Menstrie, Scottish soldier during the years of the English Civil War
- Robert Holborne (died 1647), lawyer, Member of Parliament, attorney-general to Prince of Wales, knighted 1643
- William Holborne, officer on the flagship of Admiral Sir Edward Hawke, the Kent, in 1747
