= Francis Holburne =

English admiral

Admiral Francis Holburne
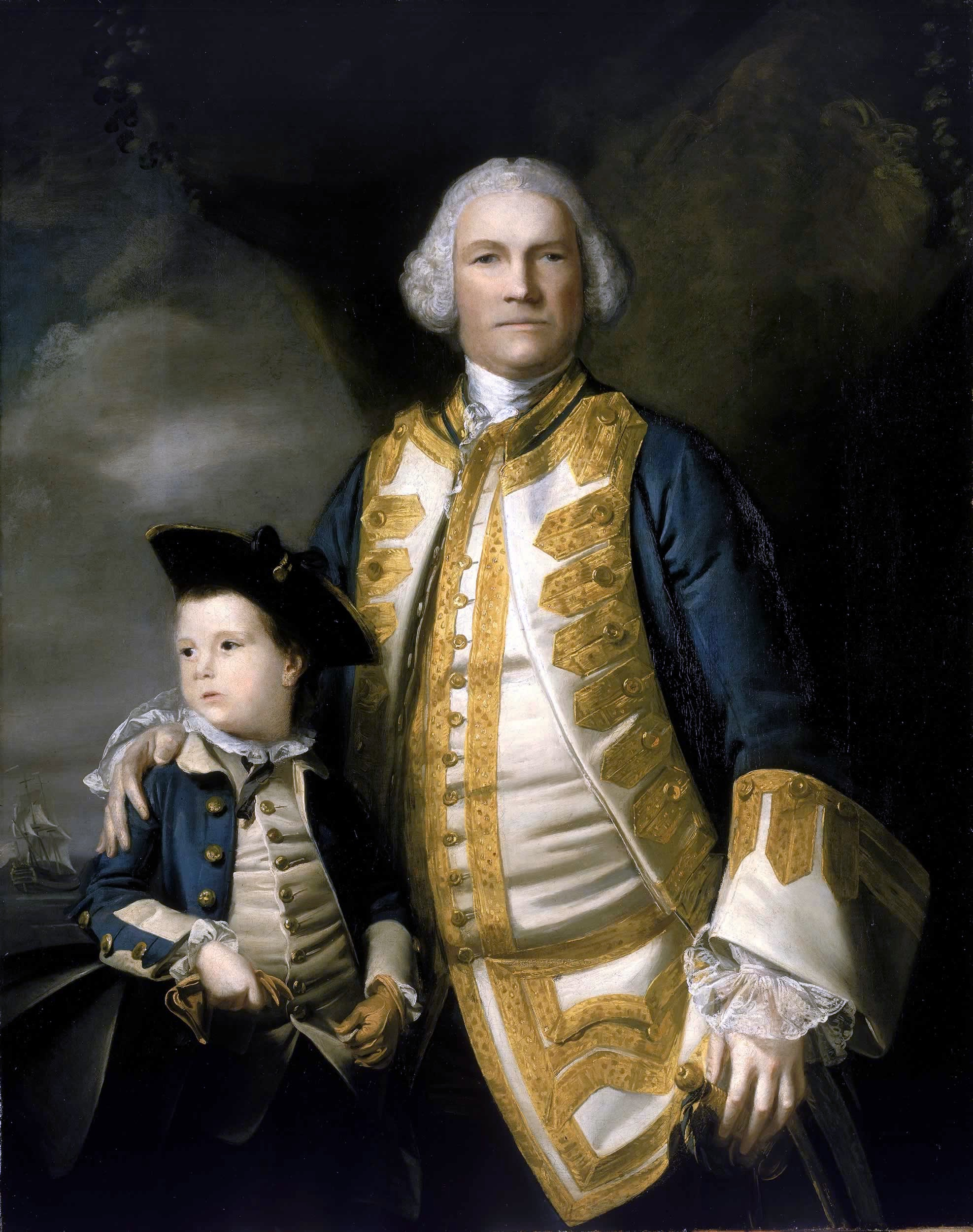
- Portrait of Holburne (right) by Sir Joshua Reynolds, 1756
- Born: 1704
- Died: 15 July 1771 (aged 66–67)
- Military career
- Allegiance: Great Britain
- Branch: Royal Navy
- Service years: 1720–1771
- Rank: Admiral
- Commands: HMS Swift; HMS Dolphin; HMS Argyll; HMS Pembroke; HMS Kent; HMS Tavistock; HMS Ramillies; Portsmouth Command; Greenwich Hospital
- Conflicts: War of the Austrian Succession; Seven Years' War

Arms of Holburne: Quarterly 1&4: gules, a fess couped between three crescents or; 2&3: Or, an orle gules, as seen on his monument in St Mary Magdalen's Church, Richmond

Admiral Francis Holburne (1704 – 15 July 1771) was a Royal Navy officer and politician. He served as commodore and commander-in-chief at the Leeward Islands during the War of the Austrian Succession and then took part in an operation to capture Louisbourg as part of the Louisbourg Expedition of the Seven Years' War. Holburne went on to be Port Admiral at Portsmouth and then Senior Naval Lord. In retirement he became Governor of Greenwich Hospital. He also served as a Member of Parliament.

== Origins ==
He was born in 1704 the second son of Sir James Holburn, 1st Baronet of Menstrie, Clackmannan, Scotland, by his wife Jean Spittal, a daughter of Alexander Spittal of Leuchat. He was the brother to James Holburne, 2nd Baronet and William Holburne, who both served in the Navy.

He was raised and educated in Inverkeithing in Fife.

== Naval career ==
=== Early career ===
Francis entered the Navy in 1720 as a volunteer aboard HMS St Albans, passing his examinations in 1725. Promoted to lieutenant on 12 December 1727, he was given command of the sloop HMS Swift in October 1735.

Holburne had known Lord Morton as an intimate family friend and may well have owed his advancement in the Navy to Archibald Campbell, 3rd Duke of Argyll who "took him by the hand in his younger days and made him a captain". Promoted to post-captain on 15 February 1740, he was given command of the sixth-rate HMS Dolphin. He transferred to the fourth-rate HMS Argyll in 1743 and to the fourth-rate HMS Pembroke in 1746 and then became commodore and commander-in-chief at the Leeward Islands with his broad pennant in the third-rate HMS Kent in 1748 during the War of the Austrian Succession. He went on to take command of the fourth-rate HMS Tavistock in 1749 and the second-rate HMS Ramillies in 1755.

Holburne aroused some resentment amongst his peers with Admiral Lord Boscawen saying in a private letter to his wife in June 1755 "he is rich and has contrived to insinuate himself into the good graces of Lord Anson."

=== Flag officer ===
Promoted to rear-admiral on 5 February 1755, Holburne was quickly sent in May to reinforce Admiral Edward Boscawen's fleet in the North Atlantic. Boscawen's mission to intercept French ships from resupplying Canada was in danger as his ships' companies were not only sickly but short of men. Holburne was later appointed a member of the court-martial that was convened to try Admiral John Byng. The trial began in December 1756 and ran until late January 1757. When members of the tribunal requested to be relieved of their oaths before the House of Lords to save Byng, Holburne refused. "...all the court martial seemed terrified....except old Admiral Holburne, who cursed and swore at the bar of the House, because Byng was not shot out of the way, without giving him the trouble of coming from Portsmouth".

Promoted to vice-admiral in February 1757, Holburne embarked on a command at Halifax, Nova Scotia to capture Louisbourg as part of the Louisbourg Expedition led by Lord Loudon. There were many delays, and fever had struck his fleet, causing much of it to remain in port. On the night of 24 September they were caught up in a violent storm which drove the 60-gun Tilbury onto the shore, sank the 14-gun Ferret and dismasted most of the remainder of his fleet. Holburne sent the most heavily damaged ships back to England while he wintered in Halifax with the rest of the fleet. On 4 February 1758 he was advanced to Vice Admiral of the White and thereafter returned to England, with his North American command transferring to Admiral Edward Boscawen.

On return to London Holburne was also appointed to the post of Port Admiral at Portsmouth, which largely discontinued his active service at sea. In September 1760 Francis made political capital of his position as Port Admiral when he stood for Provost in his native lands at Inverkeithing. During the 1760 Inverkeithing Provostship election, it is reported that he unscrupulously brought in armed press gangs to a trades meeting and with his sword drawn and by intimidation and bribery secured the return of his party.

In July 1761, some three years after the loss of HMS Invincible, the 70-gun HMS Dorsetshire ran aground on the Horse Sands. Her loss caused Holburne to issue an order to all naval shipping masters, "...to sound out the channels, which they should do several times by way of refreshing their memories, this being the second great ship they have run ashore lately." His orders did not have the effect he had intended as in October that year, just four months later, the 50-gun HMS Portland ran aground off Ryde.

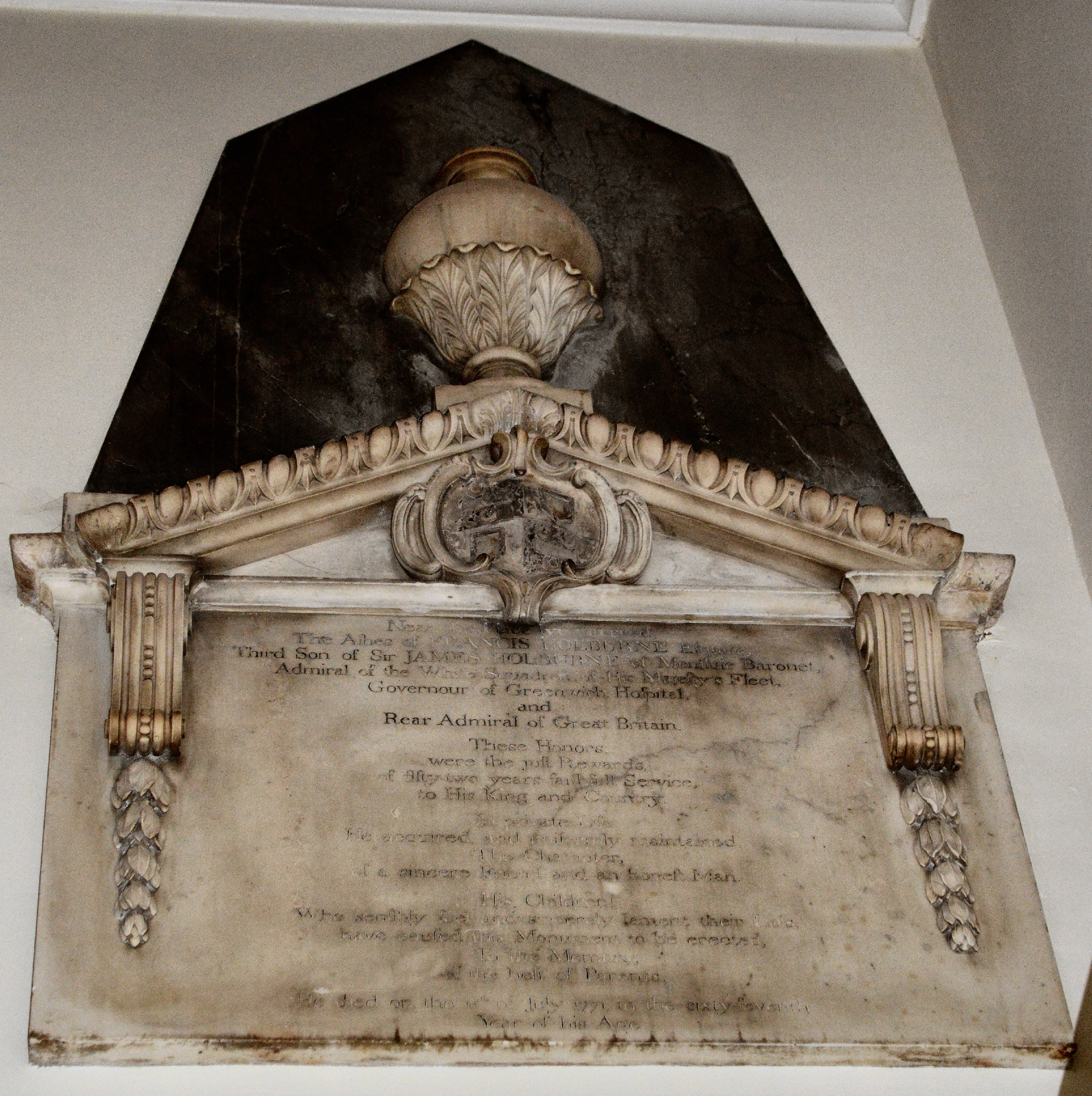
Memorial in St Mary Magdalen's Church, Richmond

In November 1764 Holburne ordered a secret investigation into an apparent plot to set fire to Portsmouth Dockyard. He was promoted to full admiral in 1766. As his port commission progressed, and encouraged by his friend and patron Lord Argyll, he contested the seat of Stirling Burghs at the 1761 General Election, beginning a career in politics. He was returned as MP for Stirling and in 1768 he represented Plymouth, holding the seat until his death in 1771. He was appointed to the Board of Admiralty as Senior Naval Lord under the North Ministry in February 1770, holding office until he was made Governor of Greenwich Hospital, by way of retirement, in February 1771. He lived at Laurel Lodge in Twickenham and died just a few months later, in July 1771.

== Family ==
In 1750 he married a rich widow, Frances, the daughter of Guy Ball, a member of the Barbados Council. Frances was the widow of Edward Lascelles, Collector of Customs at Barbados. They had one son, born in 1752, Francis who would later be known as Sir Francis Holburn, 4th Baronet in 1772 after succeeding the baronetcy from the cousin of the older Francis, Sir Alexander Holburn, 3rd Baronet.

== Sources ==
- Laughton, John Knox (1891). "Holburne, Francis" . In Lee, Sidney (ed.). Dictionary of National Biography. Vol. 27. London: Smith, Elder & Co.
- Rodger, N.A.M. (1979). The Admiralty. Offices of State. Lavenham: T. Dalton Ltd. ISBN 0900963948.

Parliament of Great Britain
Preceded by Robert Haldane	Member of Parliament for Stirling Burghs; 1761 – 1768	Succeeded by James Masterton
Preceded by The Viscount Barrington; Vice-Admiral George Pocock	Member of Parliament for Plymouth; 1768 – 1771; With: The Viscount Barrington	Succeeded by The Viscount Barrington; Admiral Sir Charles Hardy
Honorary titles
Preceded by Sir Charles Knowles	Rear-Admiral of Great Britain; 1770–1771	Succeeded by Sir George Rodney
Military offices
Preceded by Henry Osborn	Commander-in-Chief, Portsmouth; 1758–1766	Succeeded by Sir John Moore
Preceded by Sir Peircy Brett	Senior Naval Lord; 1770–1771	Succeeded by Augustus Hervey (as First Naval Lord)
Preceded by Sir George Rodney	Governor, Greenwich Hospital; 1771	Succeeded by Sir Charles Hardy
