= William Holburne =

Royal Navy officer

William Holburne (also Holborne and Holburn; died 1 April 1760) was an officer of the Royal Navy. He entered the navy, and may have served aboard the 74-gun third rate HMS Kent, during her time with Admiral Sir Edward Hawke's fleet at the Battle of Cape Finisterre.

== Career ==
Holburne was promoted to command a sloop on 21 April 1747, and was further advanced to command HMS Prince Frederick on 15 April 1748. He was appointed to command HMS Ramillies in 1755, during the Seven Years' War. Ramillies was part of a squadron commanded by William's brother, Commodore Francis Holburne. William took command of the 74-gun HMS Terrible in 1755, and Francis shifted his pennant to her.

William Holburne took command of the 80-gun HMS Newark, which formed part of the expedition to Louisbourg under his brother in 1757. He went to the Mediterranean in 1759, and served as part of Admiral Sir Edward Boscawen's fleet at the Battle of Lagos. During the battle Boscawen's flagship, HMS Namur was badly damaged and un-manoeuvrable. Boscawen therefore shifted his flag to Holburne's Newark. Holburne did not command any more ships after Newark, and died on 1 April 1760.

== Family ==
William was son to Sir James Holburn, 1st Baronet, who started the Holborn Baronetcy. William was also a brother to Sir James Holburn, 2nd Baronet and Francis Holburne, a naval officer who rose to flag rank, and uncle to Sir Francis Holburn, 4th Baronet.
