= Cavendish Crescent, Bath =

Cavendish Crescent
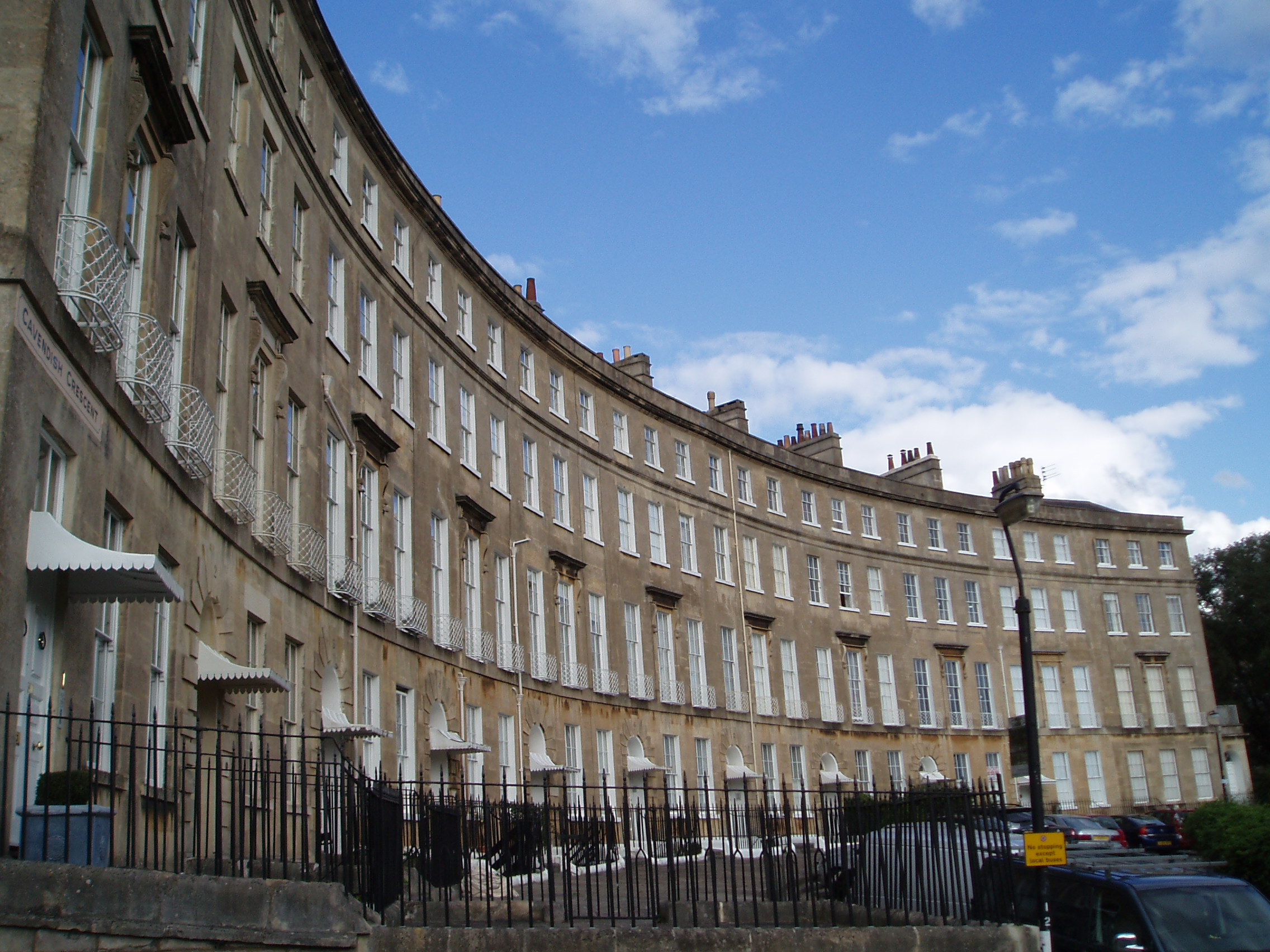

- Location within Somerset
- 51°23′32″N 2°22′12″W
- Location: Bath, Somerset, England

History
- Built: c.1815-30

Site notes
- Architect: John Pinch the Elder
- Architectural style: Georgian

Listed Building – Grade II
- Official name: 1-11 Cavendish Crescent
- Designated: 12 June 1950
- Reference no.: 1395392

Cavendish Crescent in Bath, Somerset, England, is a Grade II listed Georgian crescent built in the early 19th century to a design by the architect John Pinch the elder. At 11 houses, it is the shortest of the seven Georgian crescents in Bath. It also has one of the plainest facades, with no central feature, the only decoration being the consoles over the central first floor window of each house.

== History ==
Cavendish crescent was undertaken by William Broom, a builder by trade. Broom leased the land on which the crescent is built and then engaged Pinch to design the facade. However all did not go according to Broom's plans and he went bankrupt in 1825. The crescent was finished some 5 years later.

== Notable residents ==
Sir William Holburne lived at No. 10 between 1829 and 1874. The house was home to his art collection, which was later formed into the Holburne Museum of Art, at the end of Great Pulteney Street.
