= List of shipwrecks in 1749 =

The List of shipwrecks in 1749 includes some ships sunk, wrecked or otherwise lost during 1749.

table of contents
1749
Jan	Feb	Mar	Apr
May	Jun	Jul	Aug
Sep	Oct	Nov	Dec
Unknown date

== April ==
1749 did not begin on 1 January!^{[Note 1]}

=== 14 April ===
List of shipwrecks: 14 April 1749
Ship	State	Description
HMS Apollo	(Kingdom of Great Britain) Royal Navy	The hospital ship was driven ashore near Fort St. David, Madras, India.
Fanny	Great Britain	The ship was driven ashore between Cudalore and Fort St. David.
Lincoln	British East India Company	The East Indiaman was driven ashore and wrecked between Cudalore and Fort St. David with some loss of life.
HMS Namur	(Kingdom of Great Britain) Royal Navy	The second rate ship of the line was driven ashore and wrecked near Fort St. David with the loss of 520 of her crew.
HMS Pembroke	(Kingdom of Great Britain) Royal Navy	The fourth rate ship of the line was driven ashore and wrecked near Fort St. David with the loss of 330 of her 342 crew.
Princess Augusta	Great Britain	The ship was driven ashore between Cudalore and Fort St. David.
Winchelsea	Great Britain	The ship was driven ashore and wrecked between Cudalore and Fort St David with some loss of life.

=== Unknown date ===
List of shipwrecks: Unknown date 1749
Ship	State	Description
Elevation	Great Britain	The ship was lost off the coast of Galicia, Spain. Her crew were rescued. She was on a voyage from Topsham, Devon, to a Spanish port.
Friendship	Ireland	The ship was lost at the Old Head of Kinsale, County Cork, before 18 April. She was on a voyage from Cork to Gibraltar.

== May ==
=== 4 May ===
List of shipwrecks: 4 May 1749
Ship	State	Description
Eagle	Great Britain	The ship foundered off the Outer Hebrides. She was bound for Newfoundland, British America.

=== 14 May ===
List of shipwrecks: 14 May 1749
Ship	State	Description
Dragon	Great Britain	The ship was lost at Port Morant, Jamaica. Her crew were rescued. she was on a voyage from Jamaica to Philadelphia, Pennsylvania, British America.

=== Unknown date ===
List of shipwrecks: Unknown date 1749
Ship	State	Description
Alexander	Great Britain	The ship foundered in The Swin, off the coast of Essex before 12 May. Her crew were rescued. She was on a voyage from Rotterdam, South Holland, Dutch Republic to London.
Centurion	Great Britain	The ship was lost on the coast of Portugal. Her crew were rescued. She was on a voyage from London to Lisbon.
Content	Great Britain	The ship foundered in the North Sea off the coast of Norfolk before 12 May. She was on a voyage from Hull, Yorkshire, to London.
Mayflower	Great Britain	The ship foundered in the Atlantic Ocean off Land's End, Cornwall, before 9 May. Her crew were rescued.
Two Brotherhs	Great Britain	The ship foundered before 23 May. Her crew were rescued. She was on a voyage from Gottenburg, Sweden, to Maldon, Essex.

== June ==
=== 7 June ===
List of shipwrecks: 7 June 1749
Ship	State	Description
Varakhail (Варахаил, 'Barachiel')	Imperial Russian Navy	The ship of the line, starting her maiden voyage, abruptly capsized onto her starboard side and sank near the island of Golets in the delta of the Northern Dvina. 28 of her crew were lost, 349 saved.

=== Unknown date ===
List of shipwrecks: Unknown date 1749
Ship	State	Description
William and Betty	Great Britain	The ship was lost at Porto, Portugal. There were four survivors. She was on a voyage from Chester, Cheshire, to Porto.
Margaretta-Maria	(Denmark) Norway	The ship foundered off the Norwegian coast before 23 June.
Ranger	Great Britain	The ship foundered in the Atlantic Ocean 200 leagues (600 nautical miles (1,100 km)) off Land's End, Cornwall. Her crew were rescued by a French vessel.

== July ==
=== 25 July ===
List of shipwrecks: 25 July 1749
Ship	State	Description
Falmouth	Great Britain	The ship foundered in the Atlantic Ocean 100 leagues (300 nautical miles (560 km)) off the coast of Newfoundland, British America. Her crew were rescued by a French ship. She was on a voyage from Bristol, Gloucestershire, to Newfoundland.

=== Unknown date ===
List of shipwrecks: Unknown date 1749
Ship	State	Description
Beauford	(Kingdom of Great Britain) British America	The ship was lost off the coast of Georgia. She was bound for the West Indies.
Good Intent	(Kingdom of Great Britain) Isle of Man	The ship was driven ashore near Waterford, Ireland before 1 August. She was on a voyage from Cette, Hérault, France to the Isle of Man.
King David	Great Britain	The ship foundered off the coast of Portugal before 21 July. Her crew survived. She was on a voyage from Plymouth, Devon, to Madeira, Portugal.
Porthbean	Great Britain	The ship was driven ashore and wrecked on Neuwerk, Frisian Islands before 1 August. She was on a voyage from Falmouth, Cornwall, to Saint Petersburg, Russia.
Providence	Great Britain	The ship foundered off the Norwegian coast. She was on a voyage from Stockholm, Sweden, to London.

== August ==
=== 13 August ===
List of shipwrecks: 13 August 1749
Ship	State	Description
Charming Peggy	Great Britain	The ship was driven ashore at Bew'd, Cornwall. She was on a voyage from Saint Kitts to London.

=== Unknown date ===
List of shipwrecks: Unknown date 1749
Ship	State	Description
Mayflower	Great Britain	The ship capsized in the River Ribble with the loss of a number of lives. She was on a voyage from Barbados to Lancaster, Lancashire.

== September ==
=== 19 September ===
List of shipwrecks: 19 September 1749
Ship	State	Description
Barbara	Great Britain	The ship was wrecked near Falmouth, Cornwall. She was on a voyage from Livorno, Grand Duchy of Tuscany, to Falmouth and Rotterdam, South Holland, Dutch Republic.
Rose in June	Great Britain	The ship foundered in Mount's Bay. Her crew were rescued. She was on a voyage from Hull, Yorkshire, to Liverpool, Lancashire.

=== Unknown date ===
List of shipwrecks: Unknown date 1749
Ship	State	Description
Content	Great Britain	The ship foundered in The Swin, off the coast of Essex before 26 September. Her crew were rescued. She was on a voyage from London to Gainsborough, Lincolnshire.
Duke of Cumberland	Ireland	The ship was lost at Waterford before 15 September. She was on a voyage from Stockholm, Sweden, to Waterford.
Loyal Consort	Great Britain	The ship was lost at Plimouth, Devon, before 22 September. She was on a voyage from London to Gibraltar and Naples.
Prosperous	Great Britain	The ship was lost near Étaples, Pas-de-Calais, France before 22 September. Her crew were rescued. She was on a voyage from Virginia, British America, to Bristol, Gloucestershire.
Swallow	Great Britain	The ship foundered in the North Sea off Great Yarmouth, Norfolk, before 12 September. Her crew were rescued by a Dutch ship. She was on a voyage from Narva, Russia, to London.
Unity	Great Britain	The ship foundered in the North Sea before 15 September. She was on a voyage from Hull to London.

== October ==
=== 8 October ===
List of shipwrecks: 8 October 1749
Ship	State	Description
Dolphin	Great Britain	The ship was lost at Cape Fare.

=== 15 October ===
List of shipwrecks: 15 October 1749
Ship	State	Description
Amity's Goodwill	Great Britain	The ship was driven ashore on the coast of Virginia, British America.
Bess	Great Britain	The ship was driven ashore on the coast of Virginia.
Earl of Stair	Great Britain	The ship was driven ashore on the coast of Virginia.
Elizabeth	Great Britain	The ship was driven ashore on the coast of Virginia.
Free Mason	Great Britain	The ship was driven ashore on the coast of Virginia.
Greeny	Great Britain	The ship was driven ashore on the coast of Virginia.
Osgood	Great Britain	The ship was driven ashore on the coast of Virginia.
Rawleigh	Great Britain	The ship was driven ashore on the coast of Virginia.
Rothery	Great Britain	The ship was driven ashore on the coast of Virginia.
Superbe	Great Britain	The ship foundered in the Atlantic Ocean off Cape Spartel, Morocco.
Thistle	Great Britain	The ship was driven ashore on the coast of Virginia.
York	Great Britain	The ship was driven ashore on the coast of Virginia.

=== 18 October ===
List of shipwrecks: 18 October 1749
Ship	State	Description
St. George	Great Britain	The ship was wrecked on the Hoyle Bank, in Liverpool Bay with the loss of all hands. She was on a voyage from Jamaica to Liverpool, Lancashire.

=== 31 October ===
List of shipwrecks: 31 October 1749
Ship	State	Description
Charming Molly	Great Britain	The ship was driven ashore and wrecked 3 nautical miles (5.6 km) east of weymouth, Dorset. She was on a voyage from Málaga, Spain, to London.

=== Unknown date ===
List of shipwrecks: Unknown date 1749
Ship	State	Description
Molly	Dutch Republic	The ship was lost near Veere, Zeeland. She was on a voyage from Sint Eustatius to Rotterdam, South Holland.

== November ==
=== 2 November ===
List of shipwrecks: 2 November 1749
Ship	State	Description
Nancy	Great Britain	The ship was wrecked on Barbuda. She was on a voyage from Bristol, Gloucestershire, to Jamaica.

=== Unknown date ===
List of shipwrecks: Unknown date 1749
Ship	State	Description
Clapham	Great Britain	The ship struck a rock and sank at a Norwegian port before 7 November. She was on a voyage from Saint Petersburg, Russia, to London.
Peggy	Great Britain	The ship was driven ashore at Dumfriese before 21 November. She was on a voyage from Virginia, British America, to Dumfriese.
Union	Ireland	The ship sank in Dublin Harbour before 10 November.

== December ==
=== 1 December ===
List of shipwrecks: 1 December 1749
Ship	State	Description
Golden Eagle	Great Britain	The ship was wrecked on Pelagosa, Kingdom of Naples with the loss of all but one of her crew. She was on a voyage from Livorno, Grand Duchy of Tuscany, to Ancona, Papal States.

=== 9 December ===
List of shipwrecks: 9 December 1749
Ship	State	Description
Ranger	Great Britain	The ship was driven ashore in Dundrum Bay, Ireland.

=== 13 December ===
List of shipwrecks: 13 December 1749
Ship	State	Description
Success	Great Britain	The ship was lost in "Poola Estora", on the Barbary Coast.
William	Great Britain	The ship was lost in "Poola Estora".

=== 18 December ===
List of shipwrecks: 18 December 1749
Ship	State	Description
William and Jane	Great Britain	The ship foundered in the English Channel off Berry Head, Devon. Her crew were rescued. She was on a voyage from Bilbao, Spain, to London.

=== 29 December ===
List of shipwrecks: 29 December 1749
Ship	State	Description
Mary	Great Britain	The ship foundered in the English Channel off the coast of Dorset. Her crew were rescued. She was on a voyage from Lisbon, Portugal, to London.

=== Unknown date ===
List of shipwrecks: Unknown date 1749
Ship	State	Description
Expedition	France	The ship was wrecked at Newhaven, Sussex, Great Britain, before 19 December. She was on a voyage from the Charente to Dunkirk.
Francis	Ireland	The ship was lost on the Irish coast before 29 December. She was on a voyage from Livorno, Grand Duchy of Tuscany and Seville, Spain, to Dublin.
Henry	Great Britain	The ship foundered in the North Sea before 29 December. Her crew were rescued. She was on a voyage from Maldon, Essex, to Rotterdam, South Holland, Dutch Republic.
John and Hasnnah	Great Britain	The ship was lost on the coast of Pomerania before 29 December. She was on a voyage from Danzig to London.
Lisbon Packet	Great Britain	The ship was lost near Rye, Sussex, before 22 December. She was on a voyage from Lisbon, Portugal, to London.
Nuestra Señora de Nazareth	Portugal	The ship was driven ashore and wrecked near Kimridge, Dorset, Great Britain, before 22 December. She was on a voyage from Lisbon to Havre de Grâce, Seine-Maritime, France.
Prince William	Great Britain	The ship was driven ashore near Dunkirk before 26 December. She was on a voyage from London to Ostend, West Flanders, Dutch Republic.
St. Laurence	Ireland	The ship was lost in the Irish coast before 29 December. She was on a voyage from Bilbao, Spain, to Dublin.
Two Brothers	Great Britain	The ship was lost on the French coast before 7 December. She was on a voyage from Stockton-on-Tees to Bordeaux, Gironde, France.

== January ==
=== 19 January ===
List of shipwrecks: 19 January 1749
Ship	State	Description
Le Centaur	(Kingdom of France) French East India Company	The East Indiaman ran aground and was wrecked west of Cape Agulhas, Africa. All 400 people on board survived. They were rescued by Royal Navy ships under the command of Admiral Boscawen. Le Centaur was on a voyage from Mauritius to a French port.

=== 26 January ===
List of shipwrecks: 26 January 1749
Ship	State	Description
Amsterdam	Dutch East India Company	The East Indiaman was wrecked at Bulverhythe, Sussex, Great Britain, whilst on her maiden voyage.

=== Unknown date ===
List of shipwrecks: Unknown date 1749
Ship	State	Description
Concordia	Dutch Republic	The ship was driven ashore near Zurickzee, Zeeland before 9 January. She was on a voyage from Dublin, Ireland, to Rotterdam, South Holland.
Ebenezer	Ireland	The ship was lost on the coast of Jutland before 16 January. She was on a voyage from Waterford to Hamburg.
Endeavour	Great Britain	The ship was lost near Loo, Cornwall. She was on a voyage from Topsham, Devon, to Cádiz, Spain.
Fleece	Great Britain	The ship was lost near St. Ives, Cornwall, before 5 January. She was on a voyage from Plimouth, Devon, to Bristol, Gloucestershire.
Friendship	Great Britain	The ship foundered off Flores Island, Azores. Her crew were rescued by a Portuguese sloop. She was on a voyage from Jamaica to London.
La Carp	France	The ship was lost 9 nautical miles (17 km) west of Weymouth, Dorset, Great Britain, with the loss of fourteen of her crew. She was on a voyage from Havre de Grâce, Seine-Maritime, to Rochford, Essex, Great Britain.
Mary and Anne	Great Britain	The ship foundered in Barnstaple Bay before 9 January. She was on a voyage from Penzance, Cornwall, to Bristol.
Swift	Great Britain	The ship was lost near Looe, Cornwall, before 30 January with the loss of all but one of her crew.
Warren	Great Britain	The ship was lost near "Brixton", Isle of Wight before 30 January. She was on a voyage from Valencia, Spain, to London.

== February ==
=== 11 February ===
List of shipwrecks: 11 February 1749
Ship	State	Description
Elizabeth	Ireland	The ship struck a rock and foundered off Glandore, County Cork. She was on a voyage from Cork to the Cape Verde Islands, Portugal.

=== 21 February ===
List of shipwrecks: 21 February 1749
Ship	State	Description
King of Sardinia	Great Britain	The ship was driven ashore and wrecked at Kirkcudbright. Her crew were rescued. She was on a voyage from Jamaica to Liverpool, Lancashire.

=== Unknown date ===
List of shipwrecks: Unknown date 1749
Ship	State	Description
Concord	Great Britain	The ship foundered in the Atlantic Ocean off the Old Head of Kinsale, County Cork, Ireland. Four or five of her crew were rescued. She was on a voyage from Honduras to Bristol, Gloucestershire.
Duke	Great Britain	The ship was lost near Hull, Yorkshire, before 23 February. She was on a voyage from Hull to Lisbon, Portugal.
Happy	Great Britain	The ship foundered in Bootle Bay before 27 February. Her crew were rescued. She was on a voyage from Liverpool, Lancashire, to British America.
Jane	(Kingdom of Great Britain) British America	The snow was driven ashore at Sandy Hook, New Jersey. She was on a voyage from Jamaica to New York.
Lord Strange	Great Britain	The ship was driven ashore and severely damaged near Cobh, County Cork, before 16 February. She was on a voyage from Jamaica to Liverpool.
Memland	Great Britain	The ship lost on the Scottish coast before 20 February.
Molly	Great Britain	The ship was driven ashore at Liverpool before 27 February.
Nuestra Señora de Verecundia	Spain	The ship was lost on the Irish coast before 13 February. She was on a voyage from Seville to Bristol.
Restoration	Great Britain	The ship foundered in the Bristol Channel off Tenby, Pembrokeshire, before 13 February with the loss of all hands. She was on a voyage from Livorno, Grand Duchy of Tuscany, to London.
Rotterdam Packet	Ireland	The ship foundered off Cape Clear Island, County Cork before 27 February. Her crew were rescued. She was on a voyage from Dublin to Antigua.
Speedwell	Ireland	The ship was abandoned in the Atlantic Ocean off Youghal, County Cork, before 16 February with the loss of all but one of her crew. She was on a voyage from Dublin to Bordeaux, Gironde, France.
Squirrel	(Kingdom of Great Britain) British America	The ship was wrecked west of Weymouth, Dorset, Great Britain, before 9 February, Dorset with the loss of twelve lives. She was on a voyage from Maryland to London.
Three Brothers	Ireland	The ship was driven ashore near Cobh before 16 February. She was on a voyage from Dublin to Madeira and Carolina, British America.
Two Brothers	Great Britain	The ship was wrecked at Milford Haven, Pembrokeshire, before 9 February.
Two Friends	Great Britain	The ship foundered in the English Channel west of Plimouth, Devon, before 16 February with the loss of all hands. She was on a voyage from Málaga, Spain, to London.
Wilhelmina	Dutch Republic	The ship was driven ashore near Ramsgate, Kent, Great Britain, before 20 February. She wason a voyage from Rotterdam, South Holland, to La Rochelle, Charente-Maritime, France.

== March ==
=== Unknown date ===
List of shipwrecks: Unknown date 1749
Ship	State	Description
Benjamin	(Kingdom of Great Britain) Guernsey	The ship was lost on the French coast before 16 March. She was on a voyage from Guernsey to Newfoundland, British America.
John & Mary	Great Britain	The ship was lost at Jersey, Channel Islands, before 27 March 1750. Her crew were rescued. She was on a voyage from London to Jersey and Newfoundland, British America.^{[Note 2]}
Limington	Great Britain	The ship was lost near Wexford, Ireland before 20 March. Her crew were rescued. She was on a voyage from London to Dublin.
Neptune	Ireland	The ship was lost in the River Suir with the loss of six of her crew before 6 March. She was on a voyage from Lisbon, Portugal, to Waterford.
Nuestra Señora de Begonia	Spain	The ship was lost at Bilbao before 20 March. She was on a voyage from Bilbao to Cádiz.
Pidgeon	(Kingdom of Great Britain) British America	The ship foundered whilst on a voyage from New York to Barbados. Her crew were rescued by a Rhode Island sloop.
Pretty Patsey	Great Britain	The ship was wrecked on the east coast of the isle of Wight before 20 March. Her crew were rescued. She was on a voyage from Porto, Portugal, to London.
Salisbury	Great Britain	The ship was lost near Biddiford, Devon, before 6 March Six of her crew were rescued. She was on a voyage from Jamaica to London.
Swift	Great Britain	The ship was lost at Bilbao before 20 March. She was on a voyage from Lisbon, Portugal, to Bilbao.

== Unknown date ==
List of shipwrecks: Unknown date 1749
Ship	State	Description
Albany	Great Britain	The ship foundered in the Atlantic Ocean off the Virginia Capes, British America, before 19 December. She was on a voyage from Rotterdam, South Holland, Dutch Republic to Philadelphia, Pennsylvania.
Anne	Great Britain	The ship foundered in the Atlantic Ocean before 23 May. Her crew survived. She was on a voyage from Barbados to Carolina. British America.
Atlas	France	The ship foundered off Cape Francois, Saint-Domingue before 28 July. Her crew were rescued. She was on a voyage from Saint-Domingue to Bordeaux, Gironde.
Cannings	Great Britain	The frigate foundered within 100 leagues (300 nautical miles (560 km)) of Barbados before 13 February with the loss of four of her crew. She was on a voyage from Boston to Barbados.
De Hoop	Dutch Republic	The ship was driven ashore at Chesil Beach, Dorset, Great Britain.
Delawar	Great Britain	The ship foundered in the Atlantic Ocean 200 league (600 nautical miles (1,100 km)) off the Virginia Capes before 18 July. Her crew were rescued. She was on a voyage from London to Philadelphia, Pennsylvania, British America.
Diamond	Great Britain	The ship foundered in the Atlantic Ocean before 13 March. Her crew were rescued. She was on a voyage from Maryland, British America, to London.
Dispatch	Ireland	The ship was lost off St. Lucar, Spain, before 9 February. She was on a voyage from Cork to Seville, Spain.
Dolphin	Great Britain	The ship was lost near A Coruña, Spain, before 5 December. She was on a voyage from Lisbon, Portugal, to Bilbao, Spain.
Duke of Queensborough	Great Britain	The ship was lost on the Barbary Coast before 10 November. She was on a voyage from Bristol, Gloucestershire, to an African port.
Eagle	Great Britain	The ship foundered 5 leagues (15 nautical miles (28 km) off Livorno, Grand Duchy of Tuscany, before 20 June. Her crew were rescued. She was on a voyage from Livorno to London.
Edward Augustus	Great Britain	The ship was lost near Arless, Bouches-du-Rhône, France before 13 February. She was on a voyage from London to Marseille, Bouches-du-Rhône.
Endeavour	Great Britain	The ship foundered off the Barbary Coast before 21 July. Her crew were rescued by Molly (Great Britain). She was on a voyage from Cagliari, Sicily, to Falmouth, Cornwall.
Great Britain	Great Britain	The ship foundered in the Baltic Sea before 5 January. She was on a voyage from Riga, Russia, to London.
John and Jane	Great Britain	The ship foundered 9 leagues (27 nautical miles (50 km) off "Cape Fare" before 12 December. Her crew were rescued by HMS Rye ( (Kingdom of Great Britain) Royal Navy).
Lamplugh	Great Britain	The ship was lost on the coast of Virginia before 25 August. Her crew were rescued. She was on a voyage from Whitehaven, Cumberland, to Virginia.
Margaret	Great Britain	The ship was lost off Bermuda before 5 January. She was on a voyage from London to the Bahamas.
Memland	Great Britain	The ship was driven ashore near Seville, Spain, before 5 January. She was on a voyage from London to Seville. Memland was later refloated.
Prince Henry	Great Britain	The ship was lost near Scilla, Calabria, Kingdom of Naples before 5 January. She was on a voyage from Skanderoon, Ottoman Empire, to Venice.
Prince William	Great Britain	The ship was lost on the coast of Africa before 9 February.
Polly and Nancy	Great Britain	The ship was lost on the French coast before 13 February. She was on a voyage from London to Bordeaux.
Purcell	Great Britain	The ship was wrecked on a reef off Tortola before 7 July. She was on a voyage from Bristol to Tortola.
Resolution	Great Britain	The ship was lost in the Baltic Sea.
Ruth	Great Britain	The ship was lost at Benin before 19 January. She was on a voyage from Benin to British America.
Scipio	Great Britain	African slave trade: The ship was carrying slaves to America. They overthrew the crew and blew the ship up before 5 January.
Svyatoy Pyotr (Святой Пётр, 'St. Peter')	Imperial Russian Navy	The snow was wrecked at Pirallahi Island in the Caspian Sea.
Two Brothers	Great Britain	The ship foundered in the Atlantic Ocean. She was on a voyage from Penzance, Cornwall, to Alicante, Spain.

== Notes ==
1. Until 1752, the year began on Lady Day (25 March) Thus 24 March 1748 was followed by 25 March 1749. 31 December 1749 was followed by 1 January 1749.
2. Issue is misdated 1749.
