= Sir Thomas William Holburn, 5th Baronet =

British aristocrat (1793–1874)

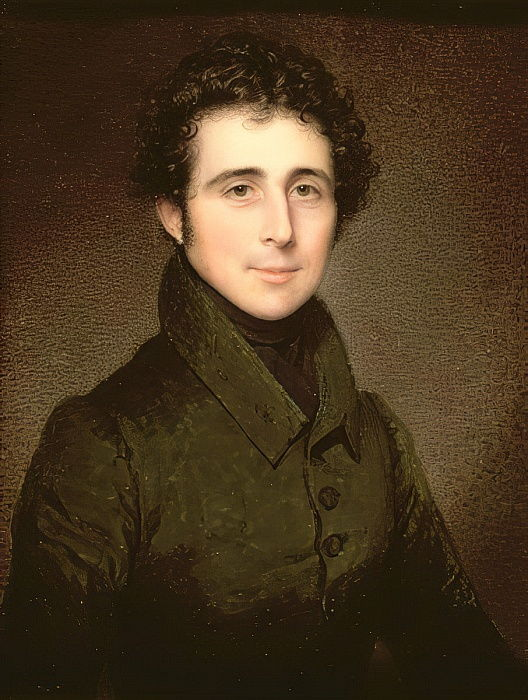
A painting of Thomas William Holburn, early 19th century

Sir Thomas William Holburne, 5th Baronet (1793–1874), generally known as William, was a Lieutenant of the British Navy and part of the last of the Holburn baronets. He is mostly known as the owner of the collections that are currently on display in the Holburne Museum.

== Life ==
Holburn was the younger son of Sir Francis Holburn, 4th Baronet (1752–1820) and grandson of Admiral Francis Holburn (1704–1771). He joined the navy in 1805 aged 11 and served at the Battle of Trafalgar aboard the Orion. He also served on the Tonnant in the West Indies in 1808 and on the Foudroyant in Brazil. He was later made Lieutenant in 1813, and was probably pensioned from the navy after 1815 at the end of the Napoleonic Wars. He inherited the Baronetcy in 1820, when his elder brother Francis died during the Battle of Bayonne in 1814.

He obtained the inheritance from his father when he died in 1820. With this he undertook a Grant Tour of post-Napoleonic Europe in 1824 by going through France and travelling around Italy, where he obtained many of his current possessions now housed in the Holburne Museum. He later came back by way of present-day Germany (passing by early 19th-century Berlin and Cologne) as well as the Netherlands in 1825. His travel during this period was a formative time in terms of developing and defining his taste as a collector of art.

William's main source of income was a £500 annuity which came from his wealthy aunt, Catherine Cussans (1753–1834), sister to Sir Francis. He also obtained a trust from her for life and he was the chief beneficiary of the inheritance. He received an additional annual £1,600 for life, a very large sum in Regency period England. With this newfound wealth he amassed a collection of paintings, silver, plate, miniatures, fine china and books.

Following the death of his mother in 1829, from 1830 William lived at Cavendish Crescent in Bath with his three unmarried sisters. After his death in 1874, he passed his collections to his last surviving sister Mary Anne Barbara (1802–1882), who led the project to establish the Holburne museum with many of her brother's art collections.

=== Collections ===
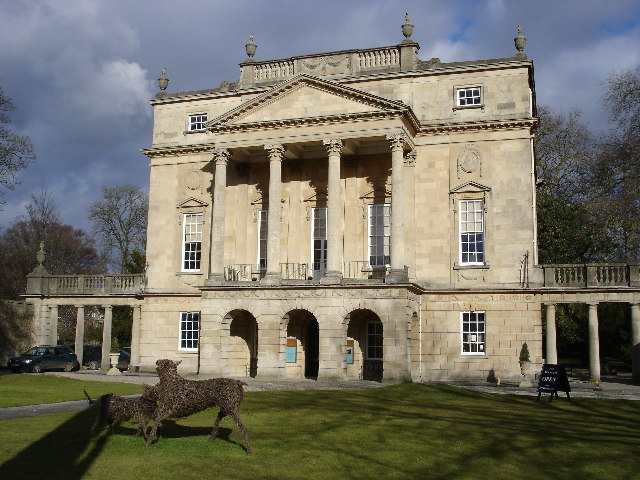
The Holburne Museum, where most of William's collections are kept.

His collection of over 4,000 objects, pictures and books was bequeathed to the people of Bath by his sister, Mary, in 1882.

William collected and inherited family treasures (Chinese armorial porcelain, silver and portraits) along with 17th and 18th century silver and porcelain items, Italian maiolica and Renaissance bronzes, old master paintings, portrait miniatures, books and furniture and a variety of other smaller items including Roman glass, coins, enamels, seals, gems and snuff boxes.

== Family ==
Some members of the Holburne family worked for the British Navy. William's grandfather, Francis was a Rear Admiral of Great Britain in 1770. His grandmother, Frances Ball (c. 1771/18–1761) was the daughter of Guy Ball (c. 1686 – after 1722) whose family took ownership of the Williams Plantation in Christ Church, Barbados. That side of the family business had dealt in sugar factories since the 1650s, in addition to money lending and slave-trading.

His family was related by marriage with some Caribbean plantation-owning families such as the Lascelles and Cussans families. Through these connections, the Holburnes were part of the British elite who obtained a significant part of their wealth from the transatlantic slave trade.

He had several siblings:

- Francis Holburne (1788–1814)
- Alicia Holburne (1789–1871)
- Catherine Holburne (1792–1873)
- Mary Anne Barbara Holburne (1802–1882)

== Sources ==
- Haber, Lutz. (1994) Bath History Volume V: The First 75 Years of the Holburn Museum. Millstream Books

Baronetage of Nova Scotia
Preceded by Francis Holburn	Baronet (of Menstrie); 1820–1874	Succeeded by Defunct
