= James Holburn =

James Holburn is the name of:

- Sir James Holburn, 1st Baronet (died 1737), of the Holburn baronets
- Sir James Holburn, 2nd Baronet (died 1758), of the Holburn baronets
- James Holburn (editor), editor of The Herald

== See also ==
- James Holborne of Menstrie, Scottish soldier during the years of the English Civil War
- Holburn (surname)
