= Mr Doodle =

English artist

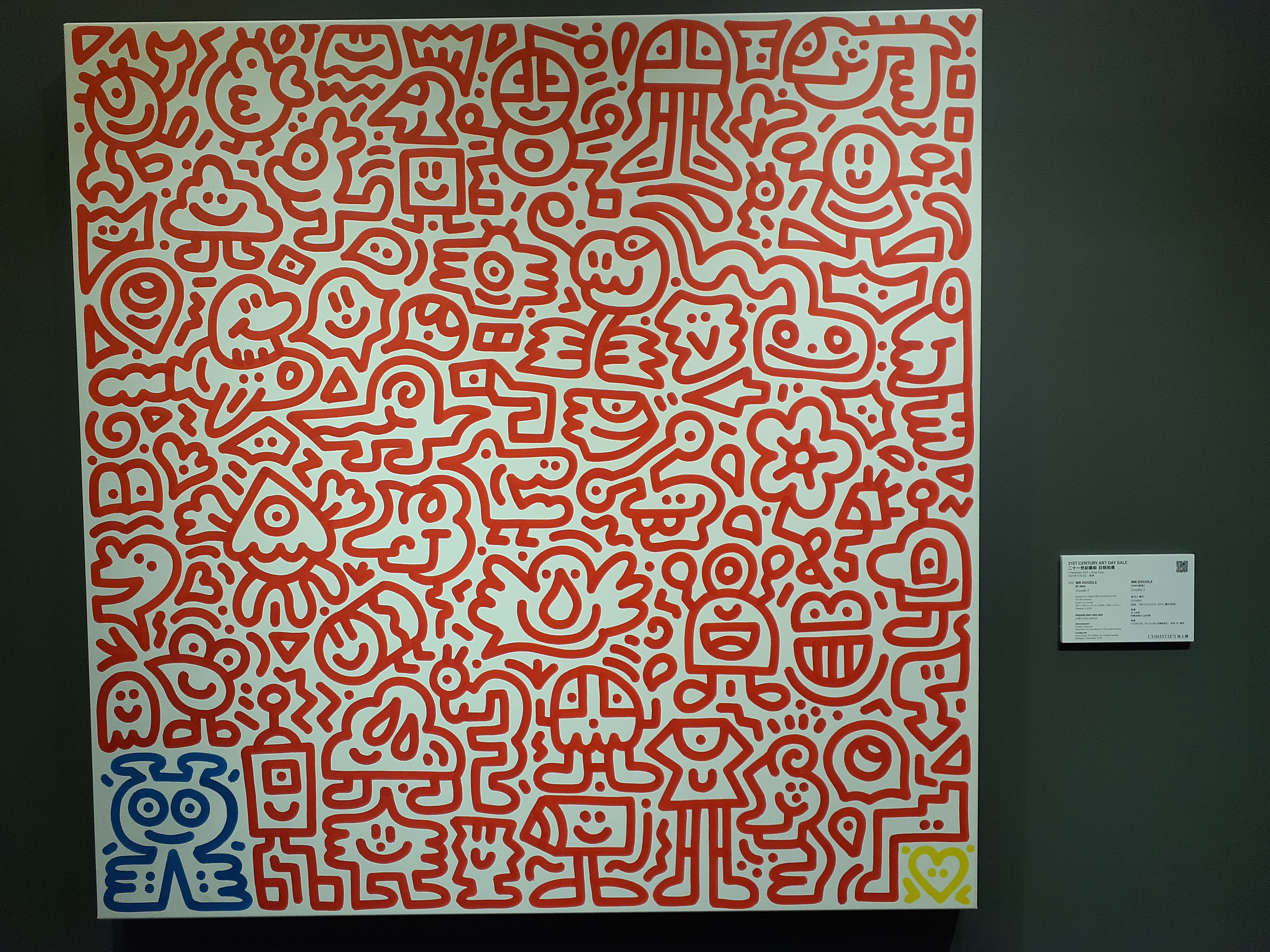
- Artwork by Mr Doodle
- Born: Sam Cox; 1993 or 1994 (age 32–33)
- Education: UWE Bristol
- Movement: Doodle
- Spouse: Alena
- Website: mrdoodle.com

Sam Cox (born 1993 or 1994), known professionally as Mr Doodle, is an illustrator and artist from St Michaels, Kent, England. He is known for his "graffiti spaghetti" style, and in 2024 had an exhibition at the Holburne Museum in Bath.

== Biography ==
Cox is from Kent, England, and studied as an illustrator at the University of the West of England in Bristol. His style of art is monochromatic doodles termed as "graffiti spaghetti". Initially struggling, selling artworks for £1, he went on to gain social media attention, with c. 3 million followers on Instagram, and international recognition. It has been reported that his artworks have sold for c. $1 million, and in 2020 he was positioned 5th worldwide for art auction sales of artists under 40.

His work rate was so intense that Cox eventually experienced mental health problems, such as psychosis.

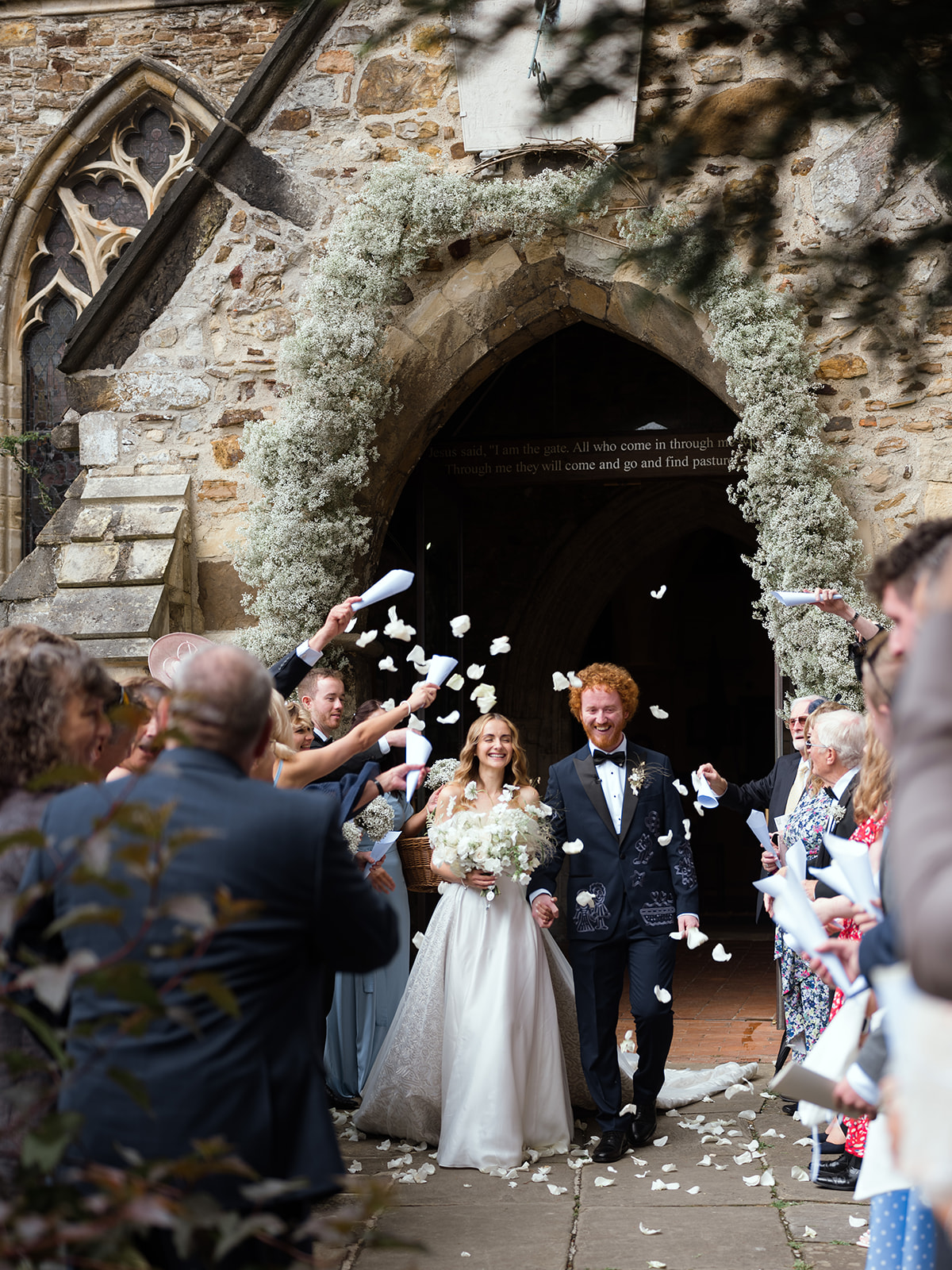
Wedding of Sam Cox (Mr Doodle), 3 August 2021 (c) Still Miracle Studio

On 3 August 2021, Cox married Ukrainian artist and illustrator Alena Kaffa, who became known as Mrs Doodle (Alena Cox), with their wedding celebrated at the Cox family manor in Tenterden, Kent.

In 2022 it was reported he had covered "every inch" of his 6-bedroom Tenterden home, including the contents, with his style of doodles. The illustrations involved "two years, 900 litres of emulsion, 401 spray-paint cans, 286 bottles of drawing paint and 2,296 pen nibs", and was reported in the Guardian newspaper as "like stepping inside a migraine".

The stop-motion film of the project achieved online popularity, and resulted in the production of the documentary film The Trouble With Mr Doodle which explored both creativity and mental health.

In June 2024, for DocFest, Mr Doodle created the Doodle Dome in Sheffield city centre. In July 2024 he covered a railway carriage in doodles for the 50th anniversary of the Kent & East Sussex Railway.

=== Mr Doodle! Museum Mayhem ===
From May to September 2024 the Holburne Museum in Bath, England, hosted the first museum exhibition of Mr Doodle's work, Mr Doodle! Museum Mayhem. The exhibition included replacing several of the museum exhibits, by artists such as John Constable, with his own works.

== See also ==
- Keith Haring
