= Doodle =

Simple drawing

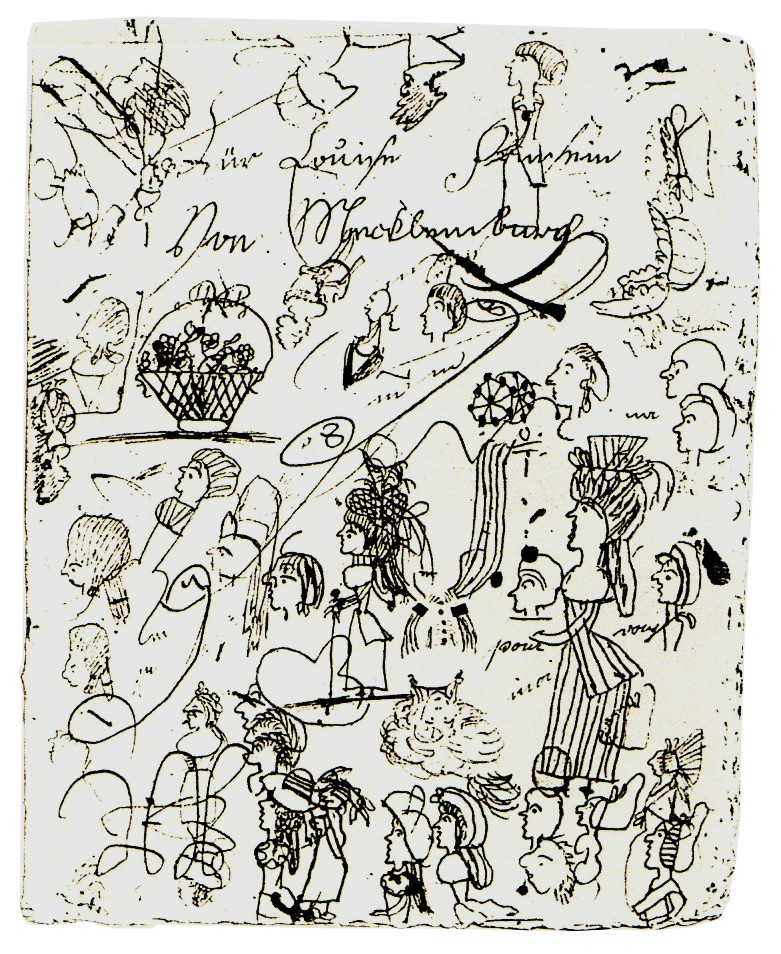
Doodle by Luise von Mecklenburg-Strelitz, Queen of Prussia, c. 1795

A doodle is a drawing made while a person's attention is otherwise occupied. Doodles are simple drawings that can have concrete representational meaning or may just be composed of random and abstract lines or shapes.

Typical examples of doodling may be found in school notebooks, often in the margins, drawn by students daydreaming or losing interest during class. Other common examples of doodling are produced during long telephone conversations if a pen and paper are at hand.

Popular kinds of doodles include cartoon versions of teachers or companions in a school, famous TV or comic characters, invented fictional beings, landscapes, geometric shapes, patterns, textures, or phallic symbols. Most people who doodle often remake the same shape or type of doodle throughout their lifetime.

== Etymology ==
The word doodle first appeared in the early 17th century to mean a fool or simpleton. It may derive from the German Dudeltopf or Dudeldop, meaning simpleton or noodle (literally "nightcap"). It is the origin of the early eighteenth-century verb to doodle, meaning "to swindle or to make a fool of". The modern meaning emerged as a term for a politician who was doing nothing in office at the expense of his constituents. That led to the more generalized verb "to doodle", which means to do nothing.

In the final courtroom scene of the 1936 film Mr. Deeds Goes to Town, the main character explains the concept of "doodling" to a judge unfamiliar with the word, saying that "People draw the most idiotic pictures when they're thinking." The character, who has travelled from a fictional town in Vermont, describes the word doodler as being "a name we made up back home" for people who make "foolish designs" on paper when their mind is on something else.

The meaning "fool, simpleton" is intended in the song title "Yankee Doodle", originally sung by British colonial troops during the American Revolutionary War.

== Effects on memory ==
According to a study published in the scientific journal Applied Cognitive Psychology, doodling can aid a person's memory by expending just enough energy to keep one from daydreaming, which demands a lot of the brain's processing power, as well as from not paying attention. Thus, it acts as a mediator between the spectrum of thinking too much or thinking too little and helps focus on the current situation. The study was done by Professor Jackie Andrade, of the School of Psychology at the University of Plymouth, who reported that doodlers in her experiment recalled 7.5 pieces of information (out of 16 total) on average, 29% more than the average of 5.8 recalled by the control group made of non-doodlers.

Various studies have found health benefits to doodling, such as preventing memory loss and maintaining attention.

Doodling has positive effects on human comprehension as well. Creating visual depictions of information allows for a deeper understanding of material being learned. When doodling, a person is engaging neurological pathways in ways that allow for effective and efficient sifting and processing of information. For these reasons, doodling is used as an effective study tool and memory device.

== As a therapeutic device ==
Doodling can be used as a stress relieving technique. This is similar to other motor activities such as fidgeting or pacing that are also used to alleviate mental stress. According to a review of over 9,000 submitted doodles, nearly 2/3 of respondents recalled doodling when in a "tense or restless state" as a means to reduce those feelings. Scientists believe that doodling's stress relieving properties arise from the way that the act of doodling engages with the brain's default mode network. According to graphologist and behavior specialist Ingrid Seger-Woznicki, "we [doodle] because we're problem solving on an unconscious level" and seeking to "create our life without stressing about it". Doodling is often incorporated into art therapy, allowing its users to slow down, focus and de-stress.

== History ==
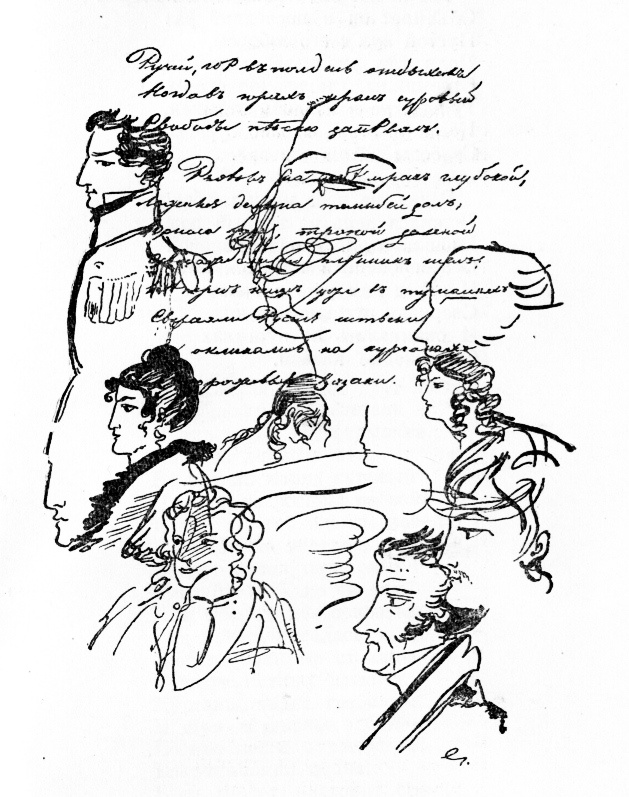
A typical page from Pushkin's manuscript

Doodling has been found on multiple archaeological artefacts at different times around the world. Examples include hand and foot prints intentionally left by children 200,000 years ago in Tibet, 1st-century drawings of stick figures and gladiators in Pompeii, and obscene drawings in the Sogdian documents from Dunhuang (9th–10th century). A young student named Onfim from 13th-century Novgorod left a variety of doodles in his school notes, written on birch bark.

== Notable doodlers ==
Alexander Pushkin's notebooks are celebrated for their superabundance of marginal doodles, which include sketches of friends' profiles, hands, and feet. These notebooks are regarded as a work of art in their own right. Full editions of Pushkin's doodles have been undertaken on several occasions. Some of Pushkin's doodles were animated by Andrei Khrzhanovsky and Yuriy Norshteyn in the 1987 film My Favorite Time.

Other notable literary doodlers have included: Samuel Beckett; Joseph Conrad; the poet and physician John Keats, who doodled in the margins of his medical notes; Sylvia Plath; and the Nobel laureate poet Rabindranath Tagore, who made numerous doodles in his manuscript.

Some doodles and drawings can be found in notebooks of Leonardo da Vinci. Mathematician Stanislaw Ulam developed the Ulam spiral for visualization of prime numbers while doodling during a boring presentation at a mathematics conference.

Many American presidents, including Thomas Jefferson, Ronald Reagan, and Bill Clinton, have been known to doodle during meetings. Other presidents who created doodles while in office include Herbert Hoover, John F. Kennedy, Dwight D. Eisenhower, Lyndon B. Johnson, and Richard Nixon.

== See also ==
- Asemic writing
- Automatic writing
- Drolleries
- Fidgeting
- Graffiti
- Graphology
- Marginalia
- Memory and retention in learning
- Mr Doodle
- Recall (memory)
- Sketch (drawing)
- Stick figure
- Stream of consciousness writing
- Ulam spiral
