= 1760 Inverkeithing Provostship election =

Election in Scotland

The 1760 Inverkeithing Provostship election was fought between Francis Holburne and Robert Haldane for the position of Provost of the town council of Inverkeithing in Fife, Scotland.

The election is notable for intimidation and bribery preceding the victory of Holburne; successful legal action by Haldane in the Court of Session for a repeat election; Holburne's unsuccessful appeal in the House of Lords; and the subsequent re-election nonetheless of Holburne in the repeat election of 1761.

== Background ==
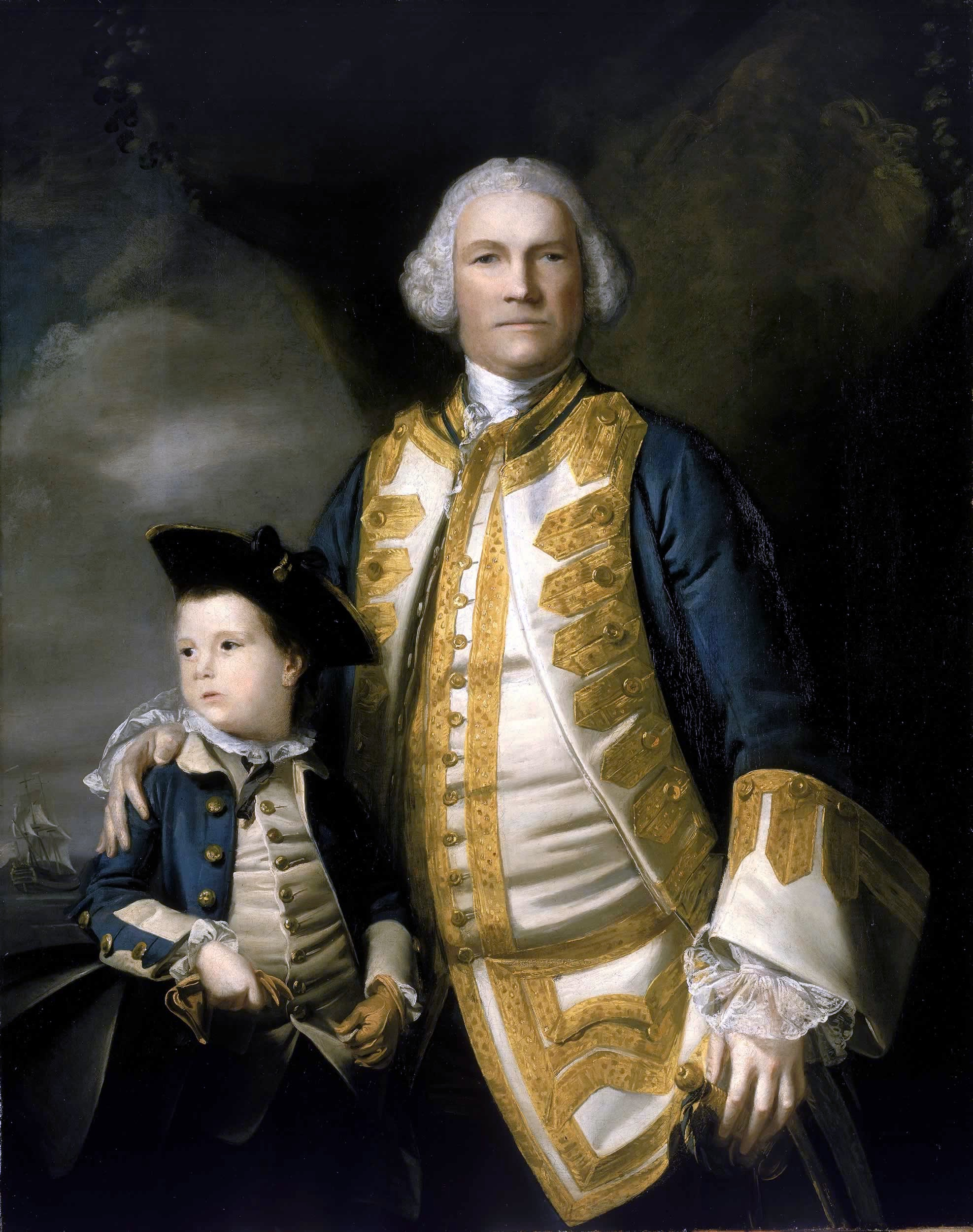
Portrait of Holburne (right) by Sir Joshua Reynolds, 1756

Francis Holburne was a Royal Navy Admiral, and had been born and educated in Inverkeithing. According to Steven (1938), 'he looked upon [the Provostship of Inverkeithing] as his natale solium'. Robert Haldane was a captain, also contesting for the position.

== The election campaign ==
Holburne's campaign against Haldane was hampered by his duties at Portsmouth. Lord Cathcart wrote in support of his candidature on 14 Sept. 1760: "The Admiral ... is a very worthy and serviceable man, and his station in the navy together with his good disposition ought to make him an agreeable representative and a useful one to those burghs, who are so much connected with seafaring people."

During the election campaign, Holburne brought in armed press gangs and entered a trades meeting with drawn sword. Furthermore, objections were taken by the town council to a number of voters on the plea they had been bribed.

Holburne's adherents denied the charges and alleged their voters "had their windows broken open under cloud of night" by Haldane supporters.

Bribery in the election was rampant. One example is that, upon learning from the Incorporation of Shoemakers that their trade was near extinction, each candidate promised help; Haldane was able to outdo Holburne by purchasing 1,500 pairs of shoes at 4/- per pair.

The town council records of 1760 note "the freedom of election in this land of liberty has been destroyed".

== Results and aftermath ==
Holburne was elected provost in the disputed 1760 Inverkeithing Provostship election.

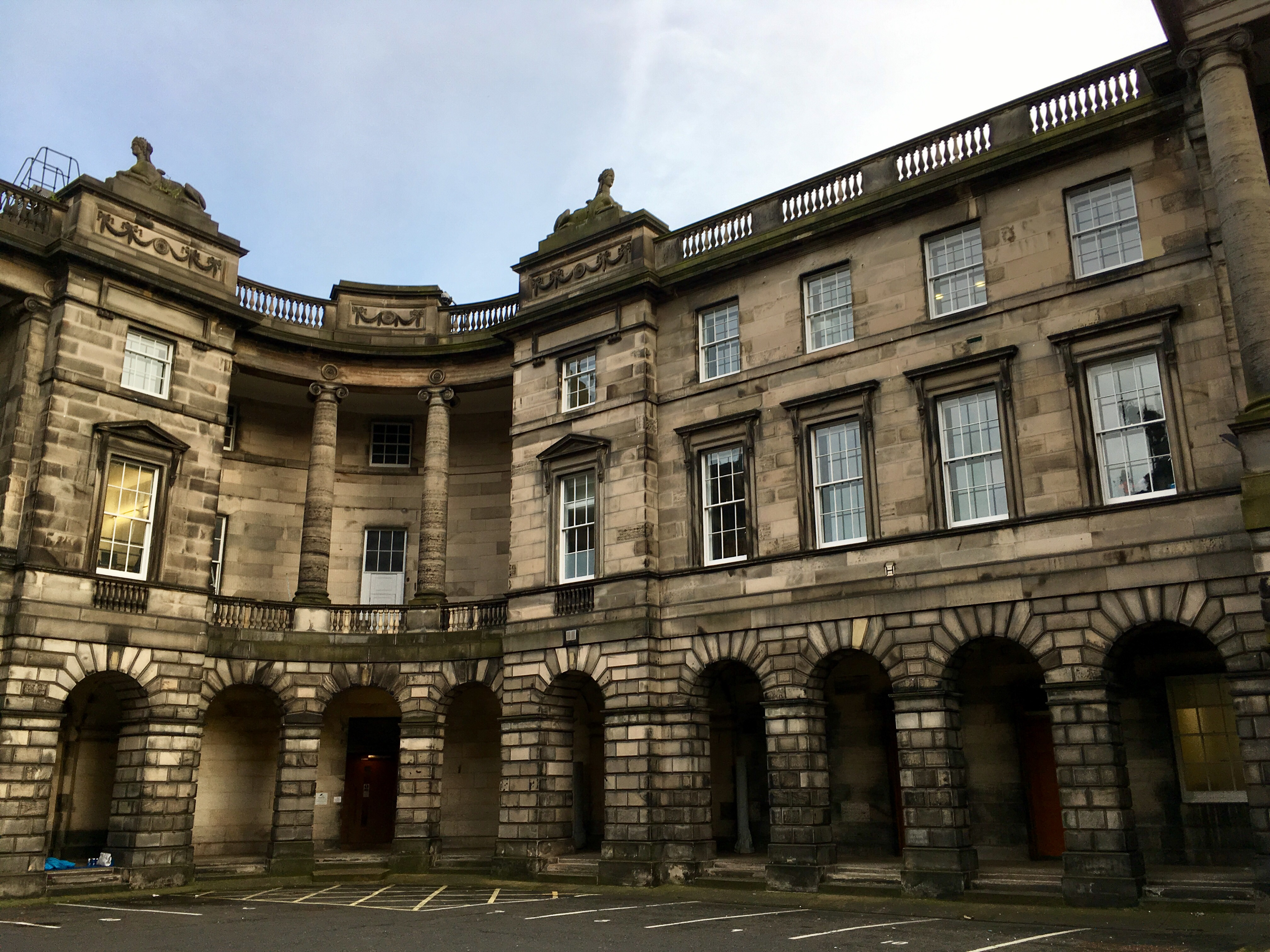
Court of Session, Edinburgh, Scotland.

Haldane successfully brought an action before the court of session for reduction of the Inverkeithing election and a repeat election to be held. Holburne appealed this at the House of Lords, however his appeal was rejected on 11th February, 1761. He wrote at the time: "it is a cursed thing to be brought to this and such an expense".

In April 1761 the repeat Provostship election took place. Holburne faced Alexander Wedderburn, who had replaced Haldane as candidate. Holburne was again elected.

Following the successful legal action against the 1760 election, Inverkeithing was without a Town Council from 1760 to 1767.

Holburne would go on to gain patronage of Bute, serving as a member of Parliament and later as the governor of Greenwich Hospital before his death in July 1771.

Intimidation continued in Inverkeithing elections until the 19th century. Stephen (1938) writes of Inverkeithing elections: "as late as 1813 we find physical compulsion in use".
