= Holburn baronets =

Overview of an English baronetcy

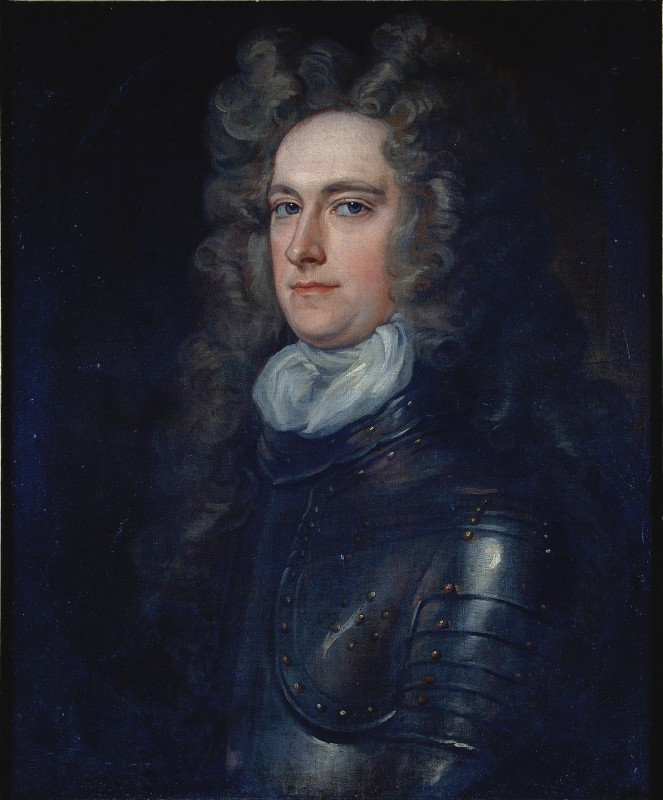
Sir James Holburn, 1st Baronet

The Holburn Baronetcy, of Menstrie in the County of Clackmannan, was a title in the Baronetage of Nova Scotia. It was created on 21 June 1706 for James Holburn who was later titled, Sir James Holburn, 1st Baronet. He was the son of Major General Sir James Holborne of Menstrie. The third Baronet was a captain in the Royal Navy. The fifth Baronet was founder of the Holburne Museum of Art, Bath, Somerset. On his death in 1874 the baronetcy became either extinct or dormant.

The family seat was Menstrie Castle, Menstrie, Clackmannanshire.

== Holburn baronets, of Menstrie (1706) ==
Escutcheon of the Holburn baronets of Menstrie

- Sir James Holburn, 1st Baronet (died 1737)
- Sir James Holburn, 2nd Baronet (died 1758)
- Sir Alexander Holburn, 3rd Baronet (c. 1728–1772)
- Sir Francis Holburn, 4th Baronet (1752–1820)
- Sir Thomas William Holburn, 5th Baronet (1793–1874)

== See also ==
- William Holburne, son of Sir James Holburn, 1st Baronet
- Francis Holburne, son of Sir James Holburn, 1st Baronet
