= Sir Alexander Holburn, 3rd Baronet =

Royal Navy officer and baronet

Captain Sir Alexander Holburn Bt
- Born: c.1728
- Died: 22 January 1772
- Military career
- Allegiance: Kingdom of Great Britain
- Branch: Royal Navy
- Service years: 1753–1763
- Rank: Captain
- Commands: HMS Polacca; HMS Lynx; HMS Repulse
- Conflicts: Seven Years' War; Battle of Quiberon Bay

Captain Sir Alexander Holburn, 3rd Baronet (c. 1728 – January 22, 1772) (alternatively Holborne or Holburne) was a Scottish sea captain in the Royal Navy. He was the second son of the advocate Sir James Holburn, 2nd Baronet (grandson of Major General James Holborne of Menstrie) by his second wife Jean, the daughter of Alexander Spital of Leuchat. Alexander succeeded to the baronetcy on the death of his father in 1758 when he was killed at sea in 1756.

== Naval career ==
Admiral Saunders, upon leaving the Mediterranean in 1757, took with him his chaplain, his flag captain Alexander Hood, and all six of his lieutenants, among whom was Alexander Holburn. Holburn was promoted to the rank of Captain in 1763.

== Imprisonment ==
Before he could take command of his ship, Holburn was imprisoned for debt at the King's Bench Prison, Southwark, where he remained until shortly before his death. His wife, Maria Holburn, approached the Duke of Portland in 1766, in the hope of securing for Alexander a position. Holburn died childless, and the baronetcy passed to his cousin, Francis Holburn, 4th Baronet, son of Admiral Francis Holburn.

Baronetage of Nova Scotia
Preceded by James Holburn	Baronet (of Menstrie); 1758–1772	Succeeded by Francis Holburn
