= Sir Francis Holburn, 4th Baronet =

English baronet (1752–1820)

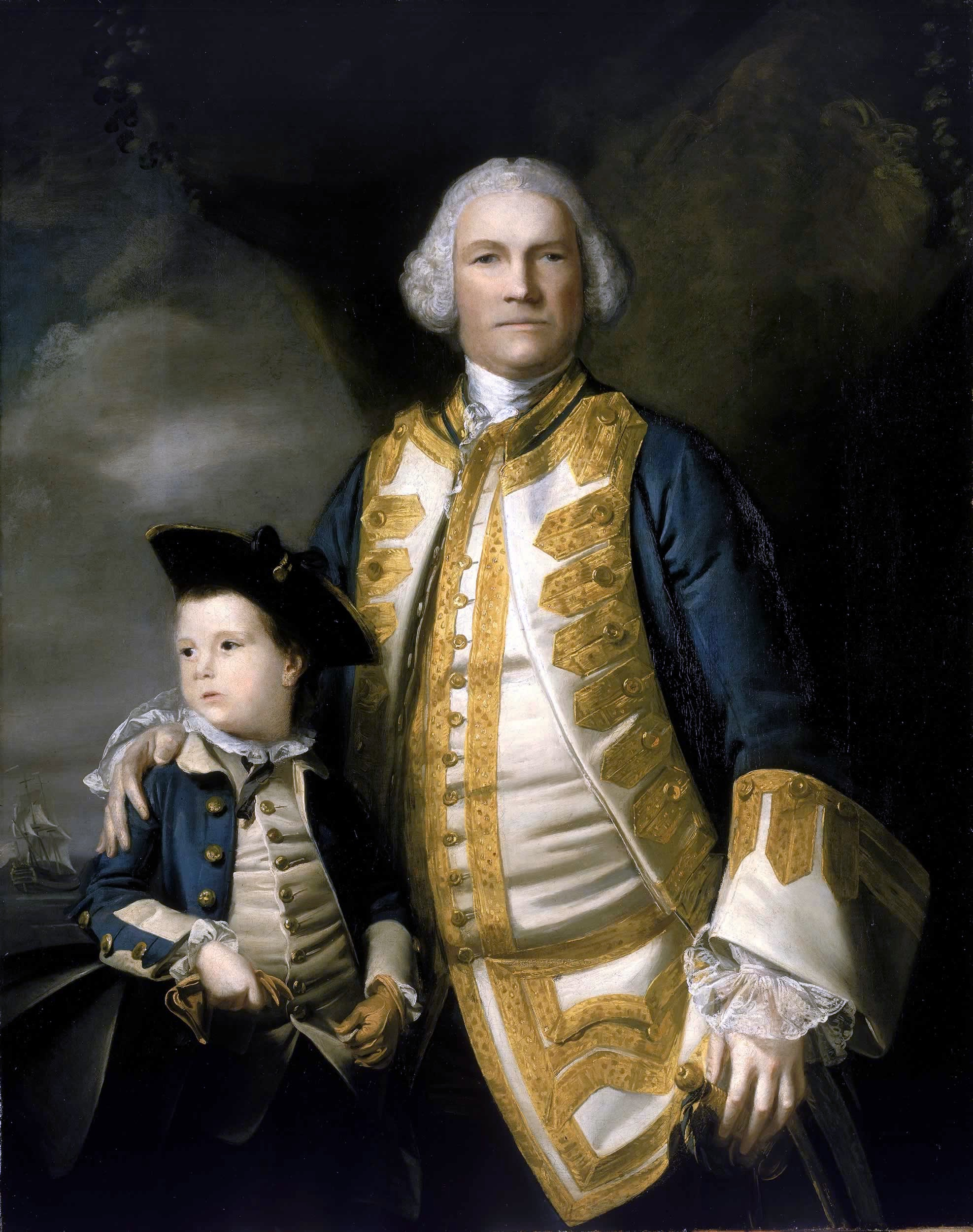
A young Francis alongside his father in a 1756 portrait by Joshua Reynolds

Sir Francis Holburn, 4th Baronet (1752–1820), was an English baronet and son of Admiral Francis Holburne.

Francis Holburne inherited the family title from his cousin Sir Alexander Holburn, 3rd Baronet, in 1772. In 1786 he went on to marry Alicia Brayne (1766–1829) and they lived in Lower Sketty near Swansea. They moved to Bath in 1801 in Lansdown Crescent, where their family connection to the Lascelles would have been socially important.

With his wife, he had seven children (two of which died in infancy), three daughters, Alicia, Catherine and Mary, and two sons, Francis who would later fight and die of his wounds in the Battle of Bayonne in 1814, and William,⁣ who would later be known for his collections housed in the Holburn Museum.

== Sources ==
- Haber, Lutz. (1994) Bath History Volume V: The First 75 Years of the Holburne Museum. Millstream Books

Baronetage of Nova Scotia
Preceded by Alexander Holburn	Baronet (of Menstrie); 1772–1820	Succeeded by Thomas William Holburn
