= HMS Pembroke (1733) =

Ship of the line of the Royal Navy

History

Great Britain
- Name: HMS Pembroke
- Ordered: 8 September 1726
- Builder: Woolwich Dockyard
- Launched: 27 November 1733
- Fate: Wrecked, 1749

General characteristics
- Class & type: 1719 Establishment 60-gun fourth rate ship of the line
- Tons burthen: 956
- Length: 144 ft (43.9 m) (gundeck)
- Beam: 39 ft (11.9 m)
- Depth of hold: 16 ft 5 in (5.0 m)
- Propulsion: Sails
- Sail plan: Full-rigged ship
- Armament: 60 guns: Gundeck: 24 × 24-pdrs; Upper gundeck: 26 × 9-pdrs; Quarterdeck: 8 × 6-pdrs; Forecastle: 2 × 6-pdrs

HMS Pembroke was a 60-gun fourth rate ship of the line of the Royal Navy, built to the dimensions of the 1719 Establishment at Woolwich Dockyard, and launched on 27 November 1733.

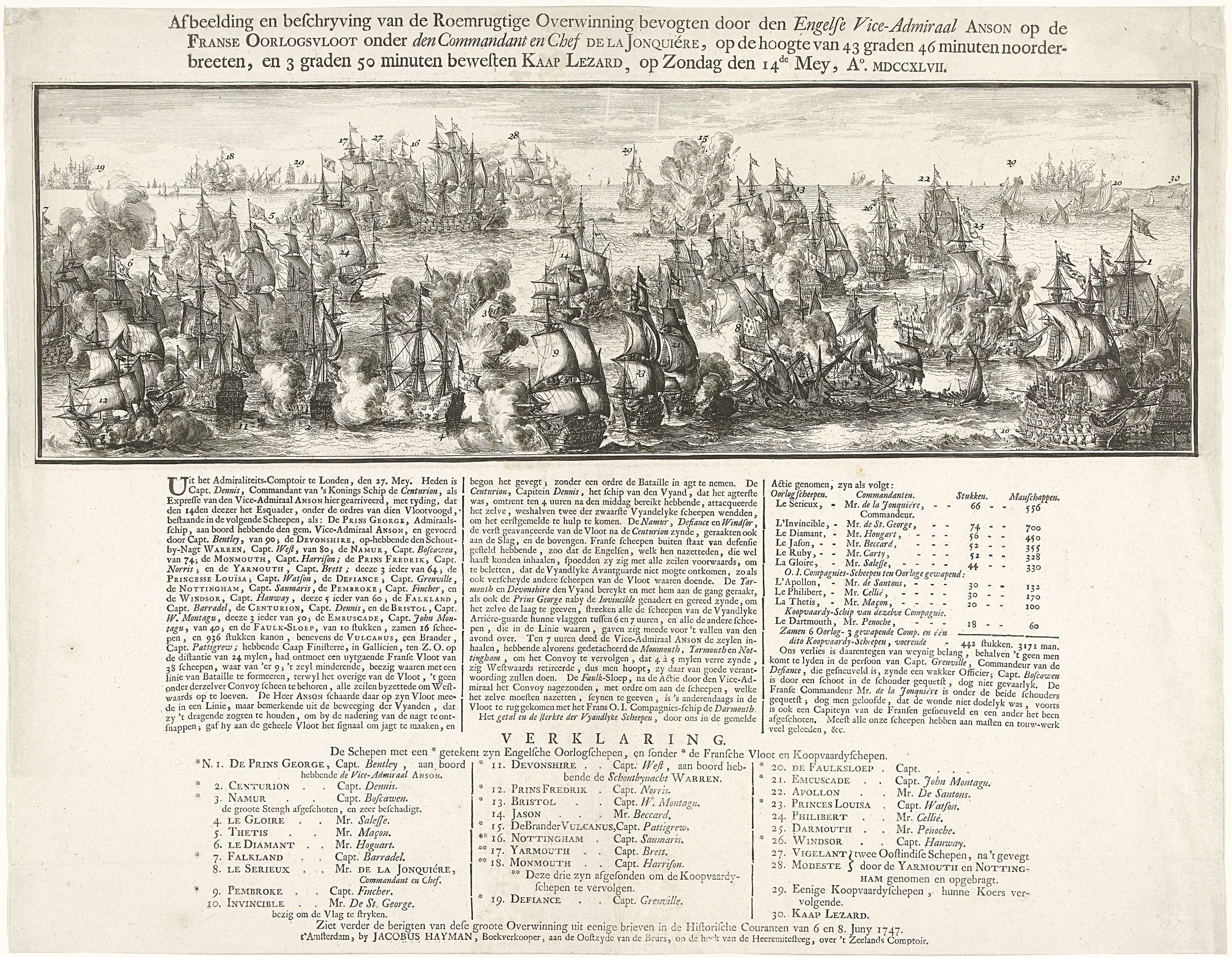
Pembroke shown here at the First Battle of Cape Finisterre (1747)

In April 1749, whilst near Fort St David, Pembroke, along with Namur and the hospital ship Apollo, was wrecked in a storm, with the loss of 330 of her crew, only 12 being saved.
