= HMS Kent (1746) =

18th century 64-gun third rate ship of the line of the Royal Navy

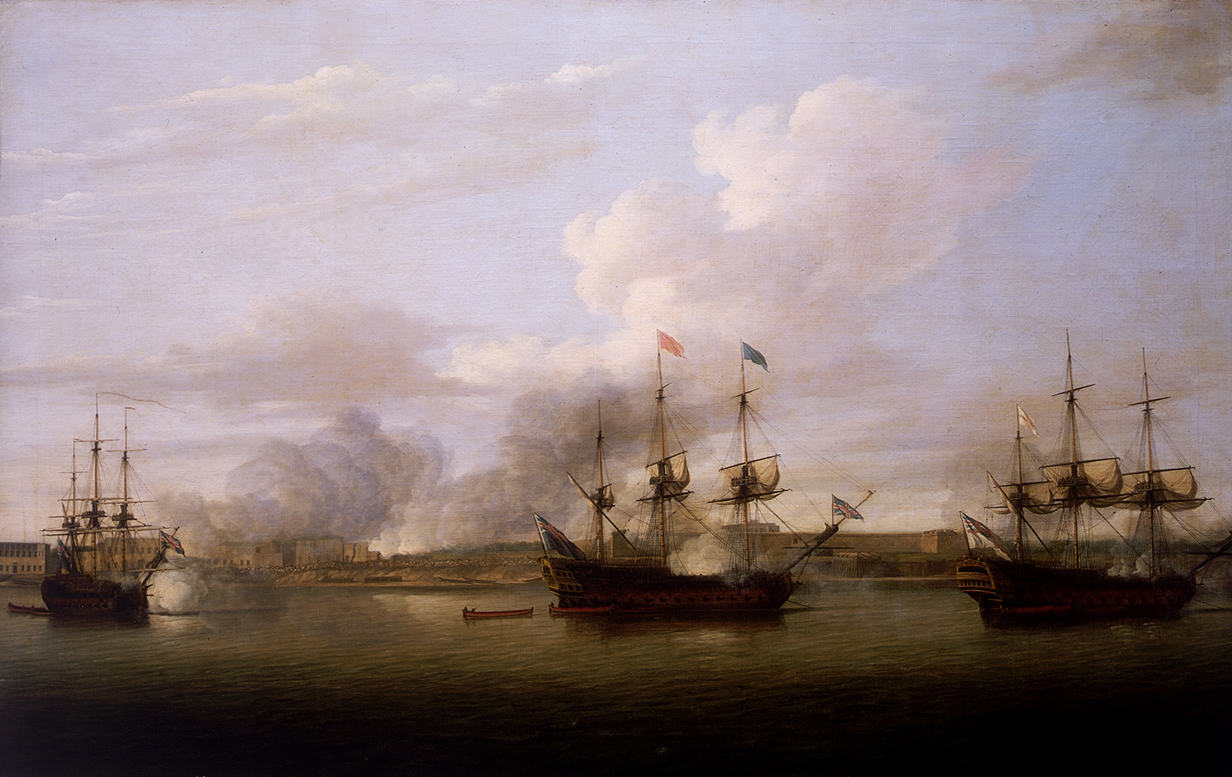
- Kent (centre) at the Battle of Chandannagar

History

Great Britain
- Name: HMS Kent
- Ordered: 10 May 1743
- Builder: Deptford Dockyard
- Launched: 10 May 1746
- Honours and awards: Second battle of Cape Finisterre, 1747
- Fate: Hulked, 1760

General characteristics
- Class & type: 1741 proposals 64-gun third rate ship of the line
- Tons burthen: 130910/94 (bm)
- Length: 154 ft (46.9 m) (gundeck)
- Beam: 44 ft (13.4 m)
- Depth of hold: 18 ft 11 in (5.8 m)
- Propulsion: Sails
- Sail plan: Full-rigged ship
- Armament: Gundeck: 26 × 36-pounder guns; Upper gundeck: 26 × 18-pounder guns; QD: 10 × 9-pounder guns; Fc: 2 × 9-pounder guns

HMS Kent was a 64-gun third rate ship of the line of the Royal Navy. She was ordered from Deptford Dockyard on 10 May 1743 and was built by Joseph Allin the younger to the 1741 proposals of the 1719 Establishment, and was launched on 10 May 1746. Her first commander was Thomas Fox, who had previously commanded HMS Newcastle.

== Chasing the convoys ==
In April 1747 Kent was part of a small squadron under Fox's overall command consisting of HMS Hampton Court, HMS Eagle, HMS Lion, HMS Chester and HMS Hector, and accompanied by two fireships. They cruised between Ushant and Cape Finisterre in an attempt to intercept a large merchant fleet that was sailing from San Domingo to France. After a month at sea they encountered the convoy, which consisted of some 170 ships carrying a cargo of cochineal, cotton, indigo and other valuable commodities. Their escort was four French warships, which fled upon the approach of the British fleet. Fox's squadron captured 46 merchants, and dispersed the rest. Some were later captured by smaller British warships operating in the area.

== Fox's court-martial ==
After this success Kent became part of a squadron under Rear Admiral Hawke, which was dispatched to intercept another French convoy, this time en route to the West Indies. During this period, Captain Fox's service appears to have been called into question, as Hawke requested that a court-martial be brought against him. Fox was put on trial in Portsmouth on 25 November, which was presided over by Sir Peter Warren. Fox's charge was then read, stating that:

he did not come properly into the fight, did not do his utmost to engage, disable or damage the enemy, nor assist his majesty's ships who did.

Statements were collected from the other captains involved, which served to defend Fox's personal courage. According to their version of events Fox had had Kent engage the French ship Fougueux, followed by the Tonnant, eventually shooting away the Tonnant’s topmast. Kent had then passed ahead of Tonnant, her own 'braces, preventers and stoppers having all been shot away.'

The trial concluded on 21 December, and found Fox guilty of leaving the engagement with Tonnant. They acquitted him of cowardice however, but declared that he had 'paid too much regard to the advice of his officers, against his better judgement'. Furthermore, he, his first lieutenant, and his master had misread the signal for 'close action' as meaning 'proceed to assistance of admiral'. Fox was dismissed from the command of Kent, and was later retired from the Navy at the rank of rear admiral in 1749.

== Subsequent service ==
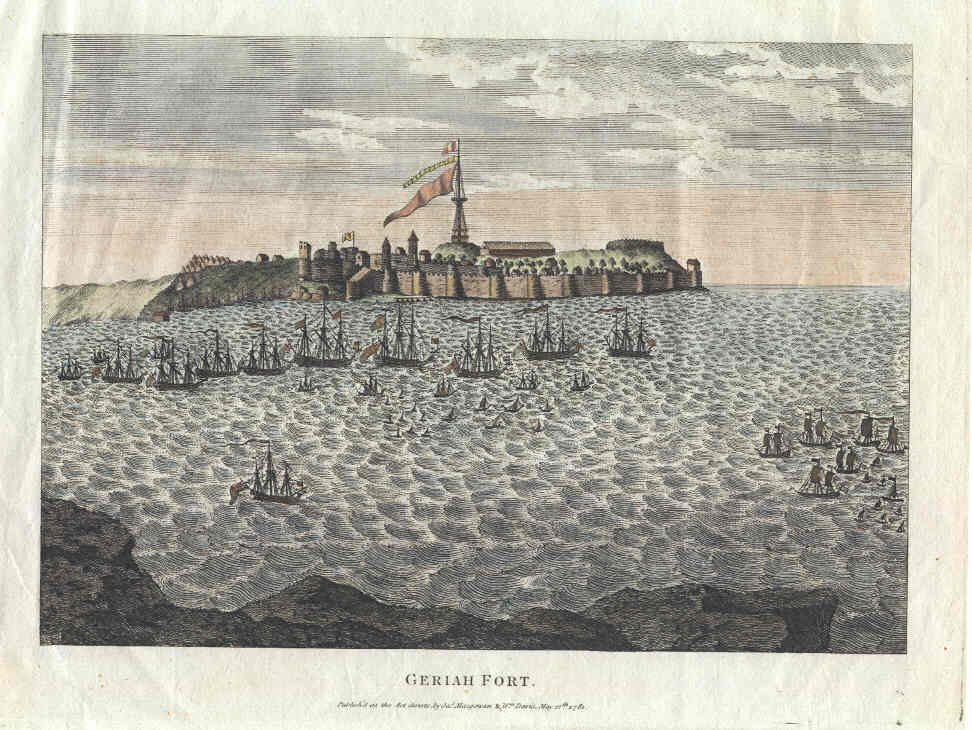
A British-Portuguese-Indian naval force attacks the fort of Geriah, 1756

In 1755 Captain Henry Speke was appointed captain of Kent. In the British anti-piracy campaign of 1756 Kent, Kingfisher, and Tiger carried 300 Indo-Portuguese Topazes to capture the fortress of Gheriah on 14 February 1756.

In 1756 war broke out between France and Great Britain, and Colonel Robert Clive of the British East India Company and Admiral Charles Watson of the British Navy bombarded and captured Chandannagar on 23 March 1757. In order to take the Fort d'Orleans guarding the town, Kent and Tiger managed to edge up the Hooghly river, although the French had tried to block it with sunken ships, booms and chains. When they were close to the fort, they opened fire with all guns, but took a great punishment from the French in the process. On board with Captain Speke was his midshipman son Billy. They were both injured, Captain Speke less seriously, but Billy lost a leg due to his thigh being shattered by a cannon shot and died later, the result of blood poisoning after the necessary amputation.

At some point Kent seems to have been under the command of a Captain Charles Windham (or Wyndham), during which time a young William Locker served aboard her.

== Hulking ==
By 1760, Kent had been hulked in the East Indies and no longer appeared on the navy lists.
