= Holburne Museum =

Art gallery in Bath, Somerset, England

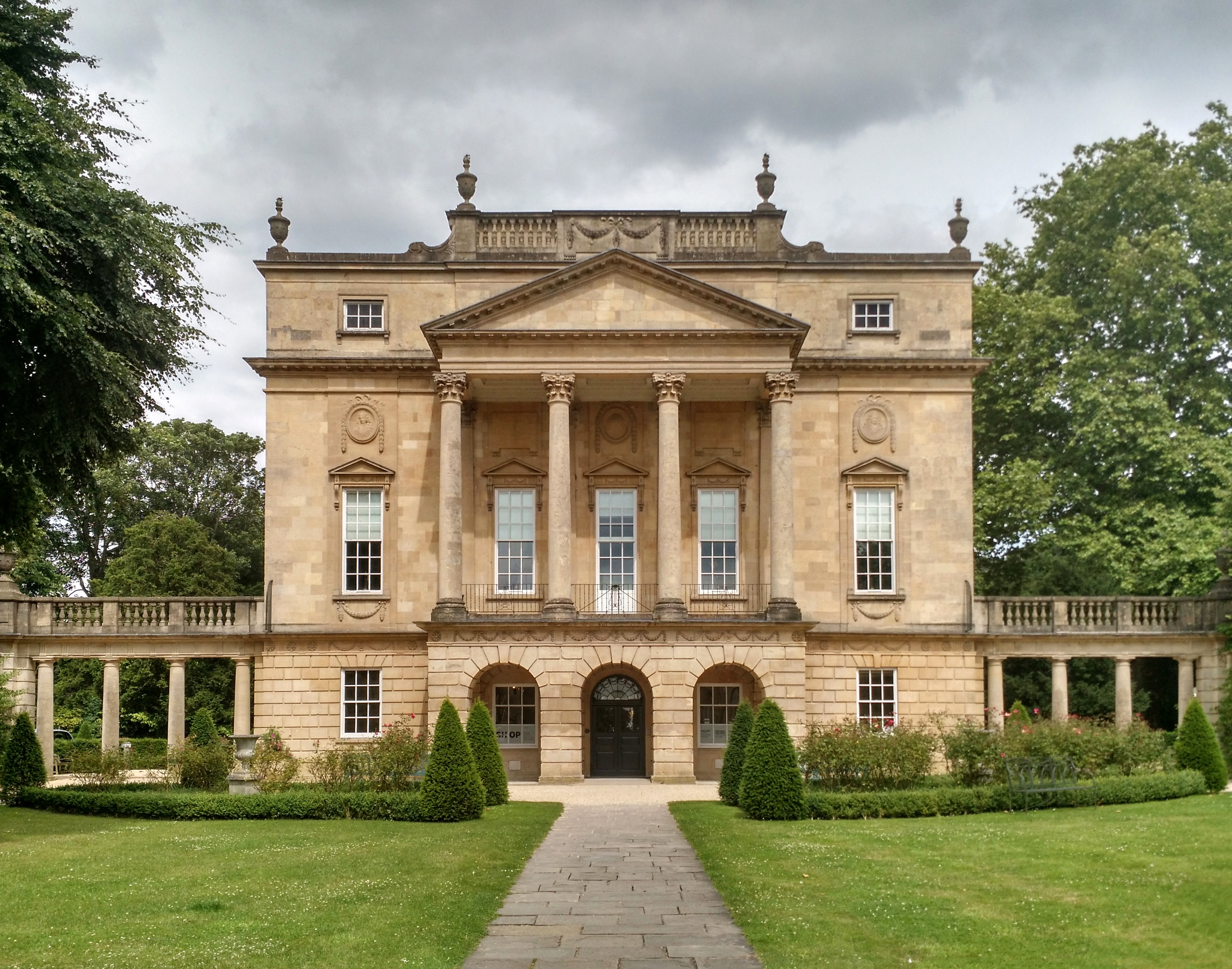
- Front facade of Holburne Museum

- Location within Somerset and the United Kingdom
- Established: 1882
- Location: Bath, Somerset
- Coordinates: 51.38566°N 2.35110°W
- Director: Chris Stephens
- Website: www.holburne.org

Listed Building – Grade I
- Official name: The Holburne Museum
- Designated: 12 June 1950
- Reference no.: 1395305

The Holburne Museum (formerly known as the Holburne of Menstrie Museum and the Holburne Museum of Art) is located in Sydney Pleasure Gardens, Bath, Somerset, England. The city's first public art gallery, the Grade I listed building is home to fine and decorative arts built around the collection of Sir William Holburne. Artists in the collection include Gainsborough, Guardi, Stubbs, Ramsay and Zoffany.

The museum also provides a programme of temporary exhibitions, music performances, creative workshops, family events, talks and lectures. There is a bookshop and a café that opens out onto Sydney Gardens. The museum reopened in May 2011 after restoration and an extension designed by Eric Parry Architects, supported by the Heritage Lottery Fund.

== Collection ==
The heart of the present-day collection was formed by Sir Thomas William Holburne (1793–1874). As a second son, Thomas William (generally known as William) first pursued a naval career. He ultimately inherited the baronetcy in 1820 following the death of his elder brother Francis at the Battle of Bayonne in 1814.

Details of the circumstances and pattern of Sir William's collecting are unclear, but to inherited Chinese armorial porcelain, silver and portraits he added seventeenth and eighteenth-century silver and porcelain, Italian maiolica and bronzes, Old Master paintings, portrait miniatures, books and furniture and a variety of other smaller items including Roman glass, coins, enamels, seals, gems and snuff boxes.

In 1882 Sir William's collection of over 4,000 objects, pictures and books was bequeathed to the people of Bath by his sister, Mary Anne Barbara Holburne (1802–1882). After the museum was opened the collection has continued to expand with over 2,500 further objects being acquired. In sections of the collection where the original holdings were comprehensive (maiolica, silver and gems) little has been added while under-represented sections have been supplemented, such as the original tiny group of glass that was greatly enlarged in the 1920s and 1930s by gifts from the Blathwayt family of Dyrham Park and the Holburne Society. Similarly, the scope of the oriental ceramics collection has been widened, with earlier pieces bequeathed by the collectors J Murray Elgar in 1955 and George Warre in 1938.

Significant acquisitions have greatly increased the museum's collection of British eighteenth and early nineteenth-century paintings and miniatures. In 1955 the museum received ten pictures from the bequest of Ernest E Cook, grandson of the travel entrepreneur Thomas Cook. These included works by Gainsborough, Stubbs and Turner. Mid-eighteenth century portraits of the Sargent family by Allan Ramsay came with the bequest of Sir Orme Sargent in 1962. With few exceptions, acquisitions were (and continue to be) required to keep with the character of the original Holburne collection to ensure its continued coherence.

The museum also owns portraits by modern artists such as David Fisher, who won the museum's 2008 competition for a commissioned portrait.

Alongside the permanent collection, the museum also has many long-term loans including the most recent from the estate of Bruno Schroder. The family loaned the museum various Northern Renaissance portraits for a period of 20 years. These loans include: Hans Burgkmeier's portrait of Jakob Fugger and Sybilla Artzt and Albrecht Durer's engravings of Christ's Passion.

== Exhibitions ==
Alongside the permanent collection and long-term loans, the Holburne Museum also hosts many exhibitions focusing on many different types of art. These are often housed in the dedicated exhibition spaces in the Roper Gallery and the Wirth Gallery. Exhibitions have also been known to be placed in the Ballroom and the Brownsword Picture Gallery.

Exhibitions from 2021 have included:

- The Tudors: Passion, Power and Conflict – An exhibition of Tudor portraits from Henry VII to Elizabeth I, featuring many courtiers and other important people within the Tudor court.
- Rossetti's Portraits – A feature of many of Dante Gabriel Rossetti's works as well as some from the Pre-Raphaelite Brotherhood. This included the Blue Silk Dress and The Blue Bower.
- Canaletto: Painting Venice – A display of the collection of the Duke of Bedford's Canaletto's depicting the canals and landmarks of Venice.
- Painted Love – Renaissance marriage portraits that reflect the complex politics of the period and the blend of realism and idealism within a painting of an intended or a spouse.
- Henry Moore in Miniature – featuring smaller sculptures by Henry Moore from the 1920s to the 1980s.
- Mr Doodle! Museum Mayhem – with artist Mr Doodle illustrating parts of museum and replacing a number of exhibits with his own works.

== Building and gardens ==
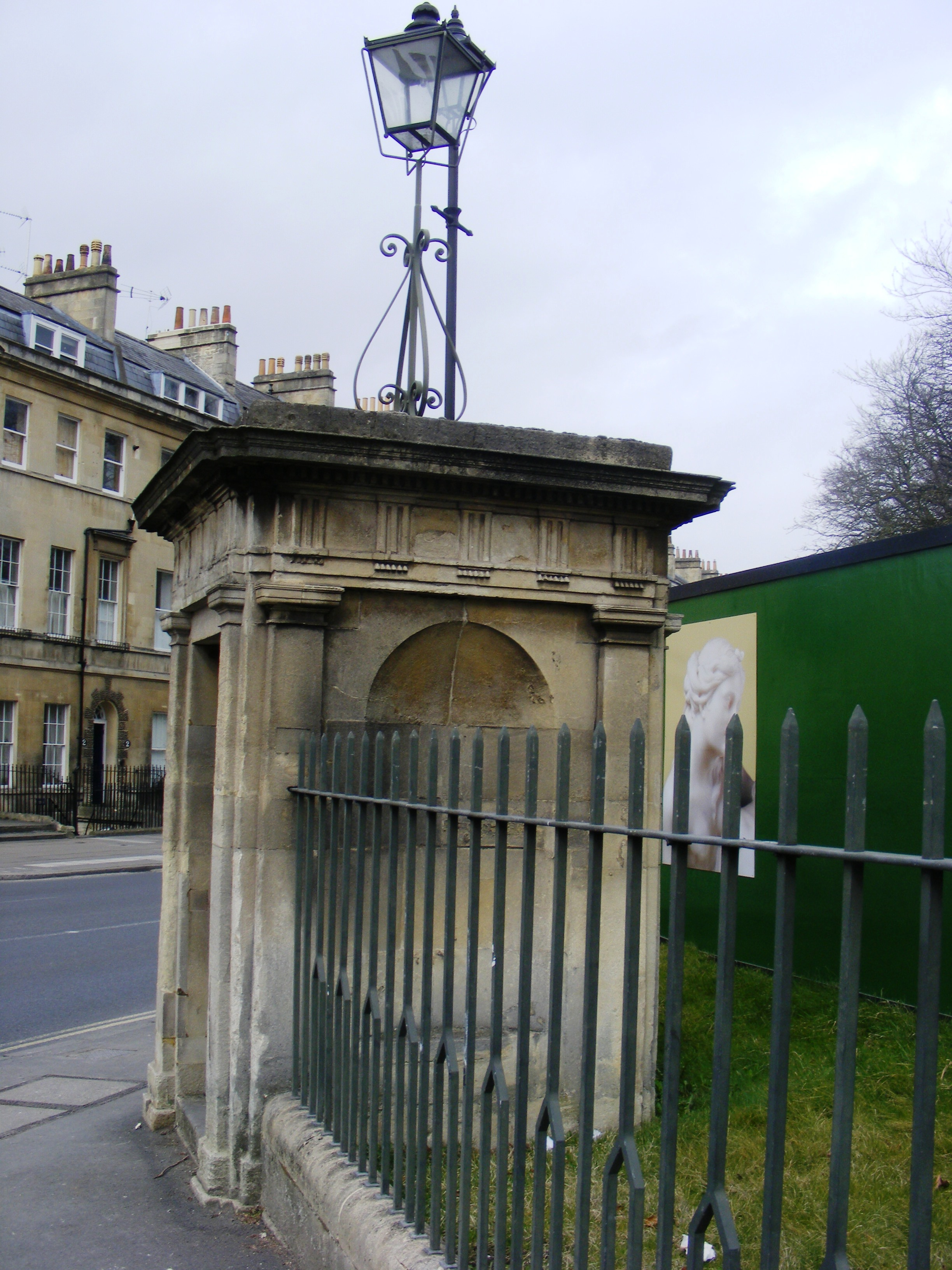
Watchman's box

Since 1916 the museum has been housed in the former Sydney Hotel at the end of Great Pulteney Street. The original design for the hotel, prepared by Thomas Baldwin in 1794, was a two-storey building which would serve the pleasure gardens, known as Sydney Gardens, laid out by Baldwin beyond. The gardens remain the only remaining eighteenth-century pleasure gardens (or Vauxhall) in the country.

After Baldwin was bankrupted his design for the hotel was not implemented. Instead a three-storey building was designed by Charles Harcourt Masters. The foundation stone was laid in 1796 and the building was ready by 1799. Visitors entered the gardens through the hotel. Projecting from the rear of the building at first floor level was a conservatory and a semi-circular Orchestra with a wide covered loggia below. Two semi-circular rows of supper boxes projected from the sides of the building. The gardens were used daily for promenades and public breakfasts. At public breakfasts tea, coffee, rolls and Sally Lunn buns were served at about midday, followed by dancing. There were generally three evening galas each summer, usually on the birthdays of George III and the Prince of Wales, and in July to coincide with the Bath races. During these galas the gardens were lit with thousands of lamps and the guests took supper accompanied by music and fireworks. Breakfasts, coffee-drinking, newspaper-reading and card-playing took place in the ground floor of the hotel and dancing in a ballroom on the first floor. All the rooms could be hired for private parties and meetings.

In 1836 the hotel was changed into a private lodging house and an extra storey of bedrooms added. The two watchmen's boxes outside the museum were added around 1840.

== Extension and development of the building ==
The form and cladding of the proposed extension, designed by architect Eric Parry RA, met with opposition from local residents, councillors and conservationists principally because it eschewed the use of Bath Stone and classical detail for modernist faience cladding. This led to a delay of more than a year before Bath and North East Somerset Council's planning committee approved the design in 2008. The £11.2 m extension finally opened in May 2011.

As built the three-storey extension is vertically articulated by mullions of brown/green mottle-glazed ceramic, intended to reflect the rhythms and foliage of mature trees in the Gardens. The bottom floor of the extension is transparent, the middle third layered and semi-transparent, and the top is a solid. The three new floors double the museum's exhibition and public space. On the ground floor the cafe provides a 180-degree view of the surrounding Sydney Gardens. The intermediate floors in the extension provide a ‘cabinet of curiosities’ display of previously stored items from the Holburne's collection. The day-lit top floor provides a temporary gallery. A secondary staircase, lift and service spaces form connection between old and new.

A basement extension now provides storage and education space. Since April 2022 the museum has opened four new galleries the Wirth Gallery in 2022, which has become a new exhibition space, and the Schroder Gallery in 2025, which is home to a collection of Northern Renaissance portraits given to the museum on long-term loan from the Schroder Family as well as another Schroder Gallery on the first floor containing paintings lent by the same family and a new collection display in the basement containing around 200 objects from the collection. The Picture Gallery (Brownsword Gallery) was refurbished in March and April 2022 with a new coat of paint and a new rehanging of the portraits that are exhibited in there.

== In popular culture ==
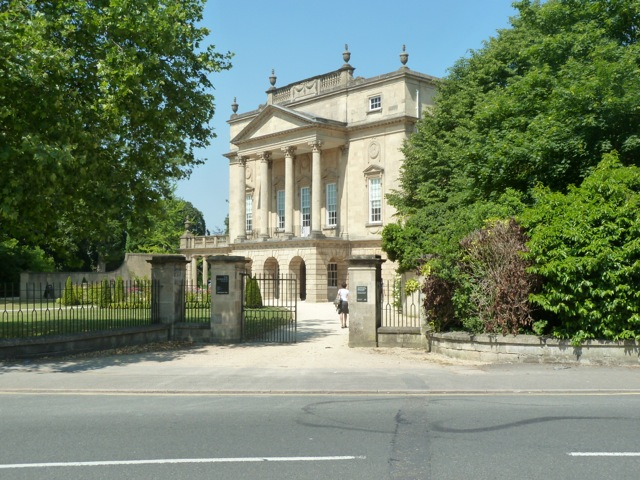
The Holburne Museum viewed from Sydney Road

Sydney Gardens provided a favourite walk for Jane Austen who set part of her novel Northanger Abbey across from the Holburne in Great Pulteney Street. Austen lived in Sydney Place, just off Great Pulteney Street, which was used in the filming of Persuasion (1994). The Holburne stood in for the Devonshire villa in the 2008 film The Duchess starring Keira Knightley, and for Steyne's mansion in Vanity Fair, the 2004 adaption of William Thackeray's novel, starring Reese Witherspoon.

The museum appears in the film Change of Heart, also known as Two and Two Make Six with Janette Scott and George Chakiris from 1961. It appears in two BBC TV series, The Count of Monte Cristo starring Alan Badel and Michael Gough (1964), and Softly Softly (1969). It can be seen in the German TV film Four Seasons starring Tom Conti and Michael York, and in the Bollywood movie Cheeni Kum (2006). The front of the museum and garden in the front has also most recently been featured in Seasons 1 and 2 of the Netflix TV show Bridgerton and the spin off Queen Charlotte, as the house of Lady Danbury.

== Academic partnerships ==
For a relatively short period, the building housed Sydney College, a school set up to rival Clifton College for its education standards. Primarily aimed at those who could afford to board their sons, the school had some success and produced a number of notable alumni. Sydney College provided the opposition to Clifton College in the latter's first rugby match in 1872.

The Holburne's role as a university museum was established in 1973 through its association with the University of Bath, but it has also engaged in collaboration with nearby University of Bristol. In 2013 the Holburne Museum and Bath Spa University announced a new partnership to promote their academic and cultural collaboration.

The Holborne Museum is also actively engaged in Public Health community education outreach through its partnership with Avon & Wiltshire Mental Health Partnership NHS Trust offering a number of adult creative well-being groups. Their Pathways to Wellbeing workshops provide the chance for people to meet, make art and explore creativity within a heritage setting. Groups are at varying levels of tuition and support with the Happy Monday's group being largely Peer led.

A number of exhibitions have been curated by staff showcasing work created by support group attendees. 'The Shape of Care: Making Care Visible' their third was 24 January - 4 May 2026

== Impact of COVID-19 ==
Because of the 2020 COVID-19 pandemic the museum closed on 18 March 2020. All but five of the museum's 25 staff were furloughed. As the museum had only a few weeks of funds they turned to crowdfunding and by 19 April 2020 had raised £23,000 out of £50,000 that they hoped to raise. The museum also looked into Arts Council funding as well as donations from past donors and patrons.
