= Formidable =

Formidable may refer to:

== Music ==
=== Albums ===
- Formidable (La Toya Jackson album), 1992 or the title song
- Formidable (Pat Martino album), 2017
- Formidable, by Oui Oui, 1991
- Formidable...!, by Bernard Peiffer, 2006
- Gabar (Formidable), by Abdel Halim Hafez, 1967

=== Songs ===
- "Formidable" (song), by Stromae, 2013
- "Formidable", by Twenty One Pilots from Scaled and Icy, 2021
- "Formidable", written by Charles Trenet

== Ships ==
- Formidable-class frigate, Republic of Singapore Navy
- French ship Formidable, six ships, including:
  - French ship Formidable (1751), an 80-gun ship of the line
  - French ship Formidable (1795), later HMS Belleisle, a 74-gun third rate
  - French ship Formidable (1795), an 80-gun ship of the line
  - French ironclad Formidable, launched 1885
- HMS Formidable, five ships, including:
  - HMS Formidable (1777), a 98-gun second rate man-of-war
  - HMS Formidable (1825), an 84-gun second rate
  - HMS Formidable (1898), a pre-dreadnought battleship
    - Formidable-class battleship, a four-ship class named for the 1898 ship
  - HMS Formidable (67), an aircraft carrier

== Sports ==
- Formidable (horse) (1975–1997), a Thoroughbred racehorse

== See also ==
- Fourmidables, a Spanish barbershop quartet
