= Matthew Buckle =

Royal Navy Admiral (1716–1784)

Admiral Matthew Buckle
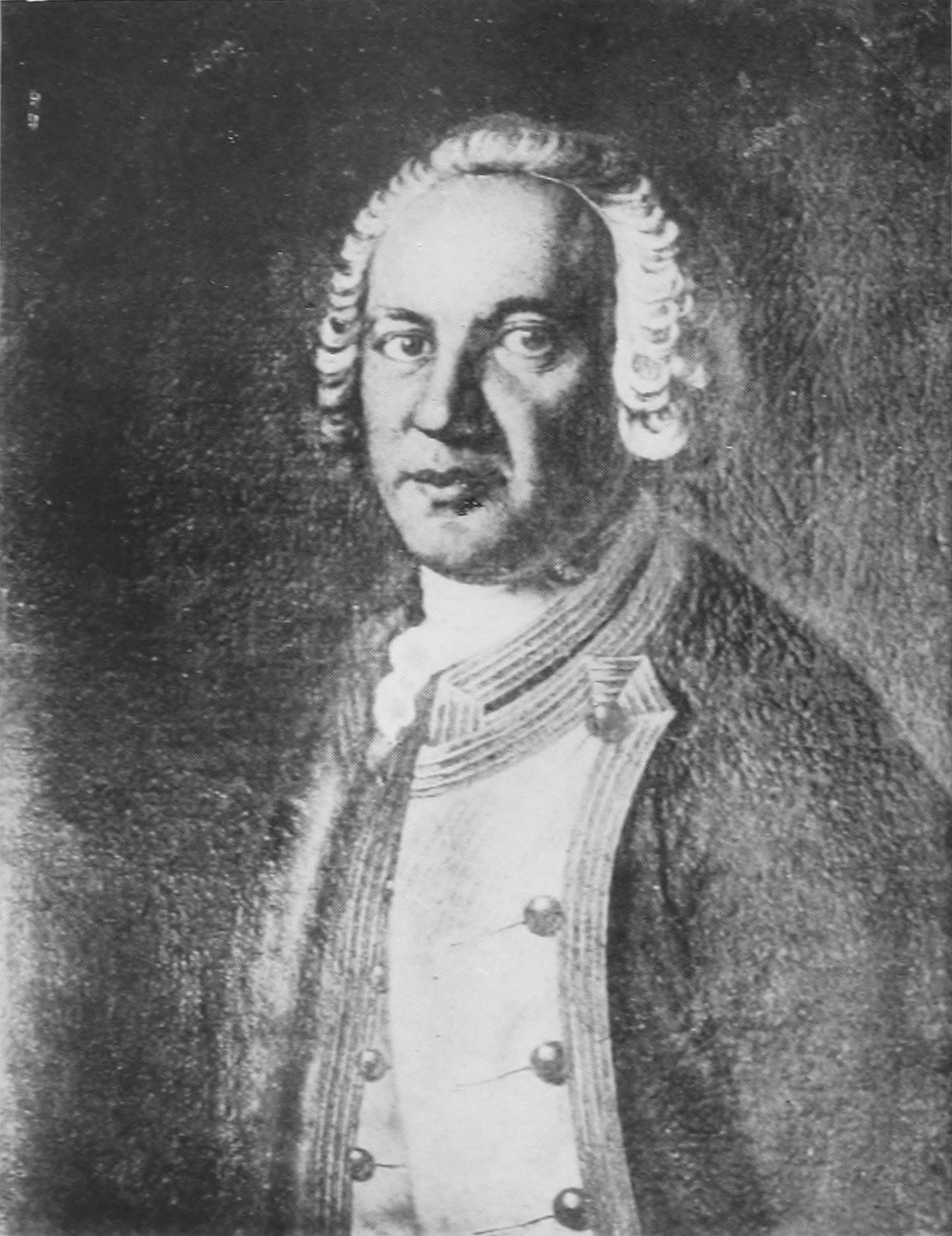
- Admiral Matthew Buckle
- Born: 1716
- Died: 9 July 1784 (aged 67–68)
- Military career
- Allegiance: United Kingdom
- Branch: Royal Navy
- Rank: Admiral
- Commands: HMS Russell; HMS Assistance; HMS Unicorn; HMS Swiftsure; HMS Invincible; HMS Royal George; HMS Namur; The Downs
- Conflicts: War of Jenkins' Ear; Seven Years' War

Admiral Matthew Buckle (1716 – 9 July 1784) was a Royal Navy officer who served as Commander-in-Chief, the Downs from 1778 to 1779.

== Naval career ==
Promoted to captain on 29 May 1745, Buckle was given command of the third-rate HMS Russell on promotion and took part in the capture of the Spanish ship Glorioso on 8 October 1747. He went on to take command of the fourth-rate HMS Assistance in 1749, the sixth-rate HMS Unicorn in 1753 and the third-rate HMS Swiftsure in 1756. After that he was given command of the third-rate HMS Invincible later in 1756, the first-rate HMS Royal George in 1757 and the second-rate HMS Namur in 1758. In Namur he took part in the Battle of Lagos in August 1759, the Battle of Quiberon Bay in November 1759 and the action of 17 July 1761 and the attack on Havana in June 1762.

Promoted to rear-admiral on 18 October 1770, Buckle became second-in-command at Spithead in 1770. Promoted to vice-admiral on 31 March 1775, he became commander-in-chief the Downs in 1778 before being promoted to full admiral on 26 September 1780.

== Sources ==
- Clowes, William Laird (1997) [1900]. The Royal Navy, A History from the Earliest Times to 1900, Volume III. London: Chatham Publishing. ISBN 1-86176-012-4.

Military offices
Preceded by John Elliot	Commander-in-Chief, The Downs; 1778–1779	Succeeded by Francis Drake
