= HMS Formidable =

Four ships of the Royal Navy have been named HMS Formidable with a fifth, the French Formidable, renamed HMS Ham after being captured and recommissioned; a sixth has been announced:

- HMS Ham (1759) was the 80-gun second rate Formidable captured from the French at the Battle of Quiberon Bay in 1759. Broken up in 1768.
- HMS Formidable (1777) was a second rate; initially of 90 guns, later increased to 98; launched in 1777. She fought at the Battle of Ushant and the Battle of the Saintes, was converted to a 74-gun third rate in 1813, and broken up later that year.
- HMS Formidable (1825) was an 84-gun second rate launched in 1825. She was lent as a training ship in 1869 and was sold in 1906.
- HMS Formidable (1898) was a Formidable-class predreadnought battleship launched in 1898 and torpedoed and sunk in 1915.
- HMS Formidable (67) was an Illustrious-class aircraft carrier launched in 1939 and sold for scrap in 1953.

== Battle honours ==
Ships named Formidable have earned the following battle honours:

- The Saints 1782
- Matapan 1941
- Crete 1941
- Mediterranean 1941
- North Africa 1942–43
- Sicily 1943
- Salerno 1943
- Norway 1944
- Okinawa 1945
- Japan 1945

== See also ==
- French ship Formidable
- HMS Belleisle (1795), a former French ship named Formidable.
