= Dublin-class ship of the line =

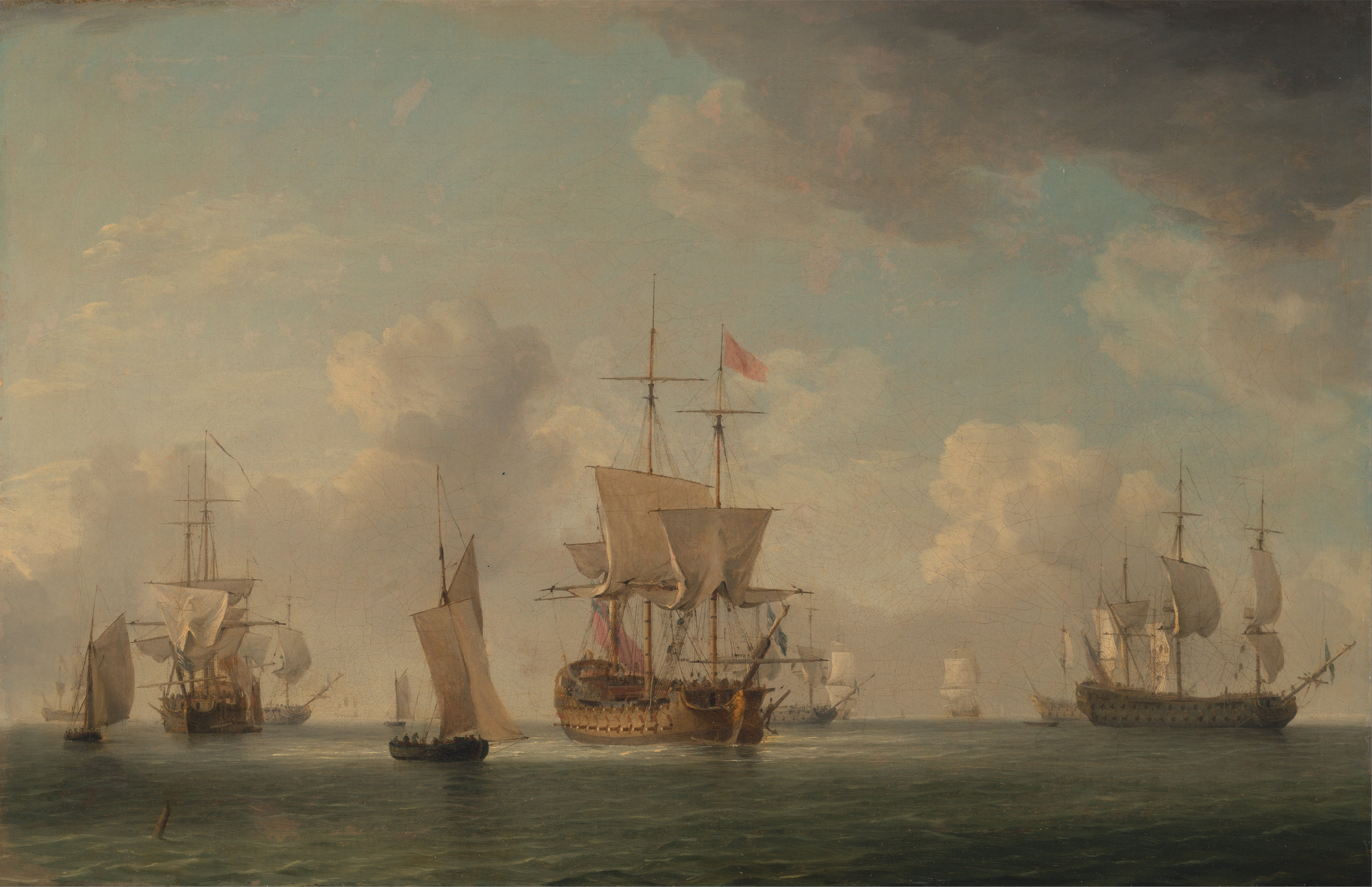
- A Dublin-class ship of the line in a light breeze by Charles Brooking

Class overview
- Name: Dublin
- Operators: Royal Navy
- Preceded by: 1745 Establishment
- Succeeded by: Hercules class
- In service: 6 May 1757 – 1802
- Completed: 7
- Lost: 2

General characteristics
- Type: Ship of the line
- Tons burthen: 1,534 87/94 (bm)
- Length: 165 ft 6 in (50.4 m) (gundeck)
- Beam: 46 ft 6 in (14.2 m)
- Depth of hold: 19 ft 9 in (6.0 m)
- Propulsion: Sails
- Sail plan: Full-rigged ship
- Complement: 550
- Armament: 74 muzzle-loading, smoothbore guns: Lower gundeck: 28 × 32 pdr guns; Upper gundeck: 28 × 18 pdr guns; Forecastle: 4 × 9 pdr guns; Quarter deck: 14 × 9 pdr guns

The Dublin-class ships of the line were a class of seven 74-gun third rates, designed for the Royal Navy by Sir Thomas Slade, although the design evolved during the construction period.

== Design ==
The Dublin-class ships were the first 74-gun ships to be designed for the Royal Navy, and marked the beginning of a more dynamic era of naval design than that in the ultra-conservative Establishment era preceding it.

Slade's original draught was approved on 26 August 1755 when the first two orders were transmitted to Deptford Dockyard. The design measured 164 ft 6 in (50.14 m) on the gundeck, some 4½ feet longer than the preceding 70-gun ships of the 1745 Establishment (although only 2 feet longer than the final 70-gun design - HMS Burford and HMS Dorsetshire ordered in 1754). The design measured 133 ft 5.5 in (40.678 m) on the keel and 46 ft 6 in (14.17 m) in breadth, to give a bm tonnage of 1,53489/94. However, before any of these ships had been begun Slade modified the design to give a revised length of 165 ft 6.5 in (50.457 m) on the gundeck and 134 ft 6 in (41.00 m) on the keel, resulting in an increased tonnage of 1,54687/94. Moreover, the final design was eventually 135 ft 2 in (41.20 m) on the keel, resulting in an increased tonnage of 1,55469/94.

The two 1754 orders had made provision for an additional (14th) pair of 32-pounder guns on the lower deck compared with the 13 pairs of the 70-gun ships of the 1745 Establishment, but had only mounted fourteen 9-pounder guns on the quarterdeck (12) and forecastle (2) to retain a total of 70; the Dublin class ships were actually fitted with eighteen 9-pounders on the quarterdeck (14) and forecastle (4); they were nominally ordered as 70-gun ships (although always designed to carry 74), but redesignated as 74-gun during construction beginning on 1 November 1755.

Two further units originally intended to be to the Dublin class design were ordered on 11 January 1757. These would have been of the same dimensions as the design mentioned above except that an amended draught on 17 March altered the keel length to 135 ft 6 in (41.30 m) and the BM tonnage would consequently have been 1,55840/94 bm. However, on 21 May this was dramatically replaced by a larger design of 1,79335/94 bm tons, derived from the draught of the ex-French prize HMS Invincible, mounting 24-pounders instead of 18-pounders on the upper deck (but with the same armament as the Dublin class on other decks). These two ships finally emerged as HMS Valiant and HMS Triumph.

== Ships ==
As with all wooden warships, these ships when completed and measured had slightly different dimensions (and hence BM tonnage) from the design dimensions, and the final measurements are listed below.

- HMS Dublin

Builder: Deptford Dockyard
Ordered: 26 August 1755
Laid down: 18 November 1755
Launched: 6 May 1757
Completed: 1 July 1757
Actual dimensions as completed:

Length on gundeck: 165 ft 6 in (50.44 m)
Length on keel: 134 ft 4 in (40.94 m)
Breadth: 46 ft 9 in (14.25 m)
Depth in hold: 19 ft 9 in (6.02 m)

Actual tonnage as completed: 1,56163/94 bm
Fate: Broken up, May 1784

- HMS Norfolk

Builder: Deptford Dockyard
Ordered: 26 August 1755
Laid down: 18 November 1755
Launched: 28 December 1757
Completed: 23 February 1758
Actual dimensions as completed:

Length on gundeck: 165 ft 6 in (50.44 m)
Length on keel: 134 ft 4.75 in (40.9639 m)
Breadth: 46 ft 8 in (14.22 m)
Depth in hold: 19 ft 9 in (6.02 m)

Actual tonnage as completed: 1,55677/94 bm
Fate: Broken up, December 1774

- HMS Shrewsbury

Builder: Wells & Company, Deptford
Ordered: 28 October 1755
Laid down: 14 January 1756
Launched: 23 February 1758
Completed: 2 May 1758 at Deptford Dockyard
Actual dimensions as completed:

Length on gundeck: 166 ft 1 in (50.62 m)
Length on keel: 135 ft 2.5 in (41.212 m)
Breadth: 47 ft 1 in (14.35 m)
Depth in hold: 19 ft 9 in (6.02 m)

Actual tonnage as completed: 1,59431/94 bm
Fate: Condemned and scuttled at Jamaica 12 June 1783

- HMS Lenox

Builder: Chatham Dockyard
Ordered: 28 October 1755
Laid down: 8 April 1756
Launched: 25 February 1758
Completed: 26 May 1758
Actual dimensions as completed:

Length on gundeck: 165 ft 5.25 in (50.4254 m)
Length on keel: 134 ft 5 in (40.97 m)
Breadth: 47 ft 0 in (14.33 m)
Depth in hold: 19 ft 8.5 in (6.007 m)

Actual tonnage as completed: 1,57937/94 bm
Fate: Sunk as breakwater, 1784; later raised and broken up May 1789

- HMS Mars

Builder: Woolwich Dockyard
Ordered: 28 October 1755
Laid down: 1 May 1756
Launched: 15 March 1759
Completed: 12 April 1759
Actual dimensions as completed:

Length on gundeck: 165 ft 6 in (50.44 m)
Length on keel: 134 ft 4 in (40.94 m)
Breadth: 46 ft 8 in (14.22 m)
Depth in hold: 19 ft 9 in (6.02 m)

Actual tonnage as completed: 1,55610/94 bm
Fate: Sold to be broken up, August 1784

- HMS Warspite

Builder: Thomas West, Deptford
Ordered: 14 November 1755
Laid down: November 1755
Launched: 8 April 1758
Completed: 27 July 1758 at Deptford Dockyard
Actual dimensions as completed:

Length on gundeck: 165 ft 9.5 in (50.533 m)
Length on keel: 134 ft 11.25 in (41.1290 m)
Breadth: 46 ft 11 in (14.30 m)
Depth in hold: 19 ft 9.5 in (6.033 m)

Actual tonnage as completed: 1,57984/94 bm
Fate: Broken up, November 1801

- HMS Resolution

Builder: Henry Bird, Northam, Southampton
Ordered: 24 November 1755
Laid down: December 1755
Launched: 14 December 1758
Completed: 23 March 1759 at Portsmouth Dockyard
Actual dimensions as completed:

Length on gundeck: 165 ft 6 in (50.44 m)
Length on keel: 134 ft 3 in (40.92 m)
Breadth: 46 ft 10.5 in (14.288 m)
Depth in hold: 19 ft 9 in (6.02 m)

Actual tonnage as completed: 1,5695/94 bm
Fate: Wrecked, 20 November 1759 during Battle of Quiberon
