= French ship Juste (1725) =

Ship of the line of the French Navy

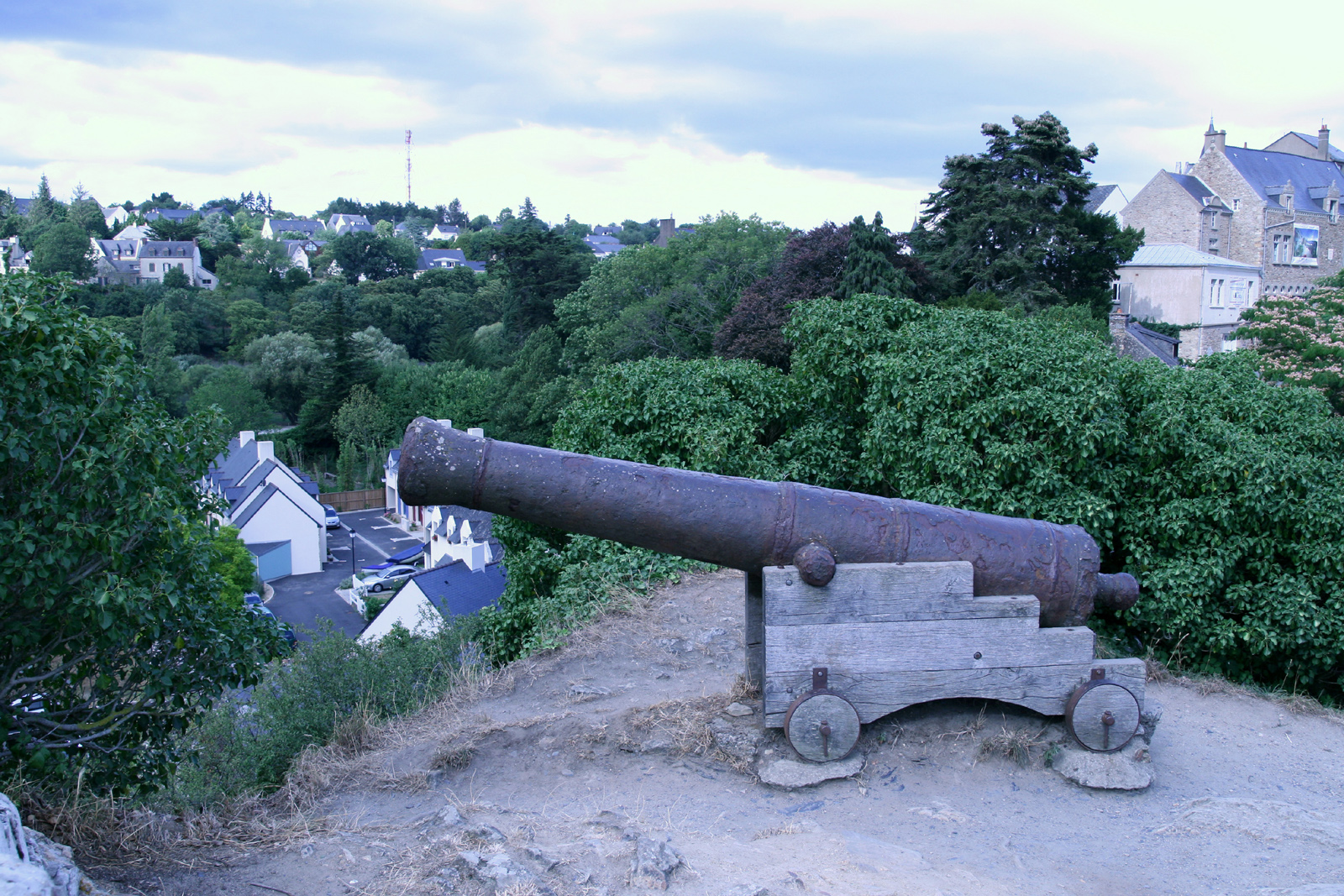
- Salvaged 18-pounder on display at La Roche-Bernard

History

France
- Name: Juste
- Namesake: "Just"
- Builder: Rochefort
- Laid down: 1724
- Launched: September 1725
- Commissioned: 1726
- Fate: Lost on 21 November 1759

General characteristics
- Displacement: 2,500 tonneaux
- Tons burthen: 1,492 port tonneaux
- Length: 49.5 m (162 ft 5 in)
- Beam: 14.1 m (46 ft 3 in)
- Draught: 7.3 m (23 ft 11 in)
- Propulsion: sails
- Complement: 7 to 12 officers, 630 men
- Armament: 74 guns: 26 36-pounder long guns; 28 18-pounder long guns; 16 8-pounder long guns

Juste ("Juste") was a 74-gun ship of the line of the French Navy, built on plans by engineer Geslin. She took part in the Battle of Quiberon Bay on 20 November 1759 during the Seven Years' War and was lost at the mouth of the Loire after the battle while trying to rejoin Saint Nazaire.

== Career ==
Juste was laid down in 1724 and launched in September 1725, joining the active service the next year. She was overhauled in Brest from 1741, where she sustained light damage on 25 December of the following year, when a fire started in the wood workshop propagated to her. She was again hove down in Brest in 1744, and overhauled in Rochefort in 1751.

On 14 November 1759, under Captain François de Saint Aloüarn, she was part of a 20-ship and 5-frigate strong squadron under Marshal de Conflans that was to attempt a landing in Cornwall for the planned French Invasion of Britain. The French fleet was intercepted by the English ships under Admiral Hawke on 20 November.

In the ensuing Battle of Quiberon Bay, Juste was in the rear-guard of the French fleet, taking the fourth position in the line of the srd Division. Juste was engaged by up to four English ship and was severely battered, with a number of leaks and her rudder shattered; by 20:00, she was unable to fight, her captain mortally wounded and her first officer killed, and limped back to Penchâteau Point to effect summary repairs. She then attempted to proceed to Saint Nazaire at low tide, and ran aground in the mouth of the Loire, at Chemoulin Point, a few miles before reaching safety. Her crew threw all cargo overboard to lighten the ship and prevent her from breaking, even cutting her masts, but to no avail: Juste settled on the bottom and her crew abandoned the ship. She then broke and sank within the next three hours. About 150 of her crew survived.

== Legacy ==
The wreck of Juste was re-discovered in December 1968 during widening work of the entry channel of the Loire.

One 18-pounder long gun of Juste was salvaged and is now on display at La Roche-Bernard. Two others are on display in front of Arzal city hall.

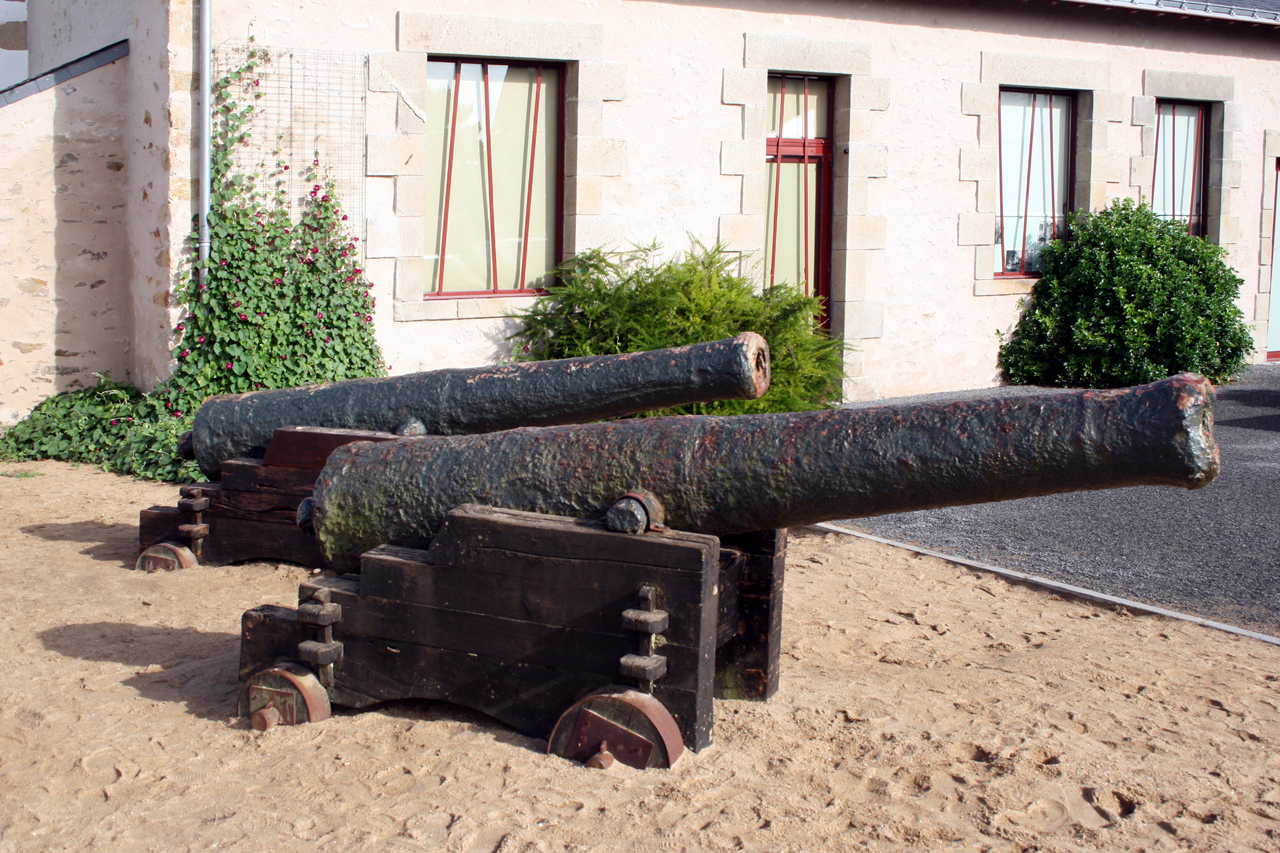
Guns of Arzal, there on temporary display at Piriac-sur-Mer

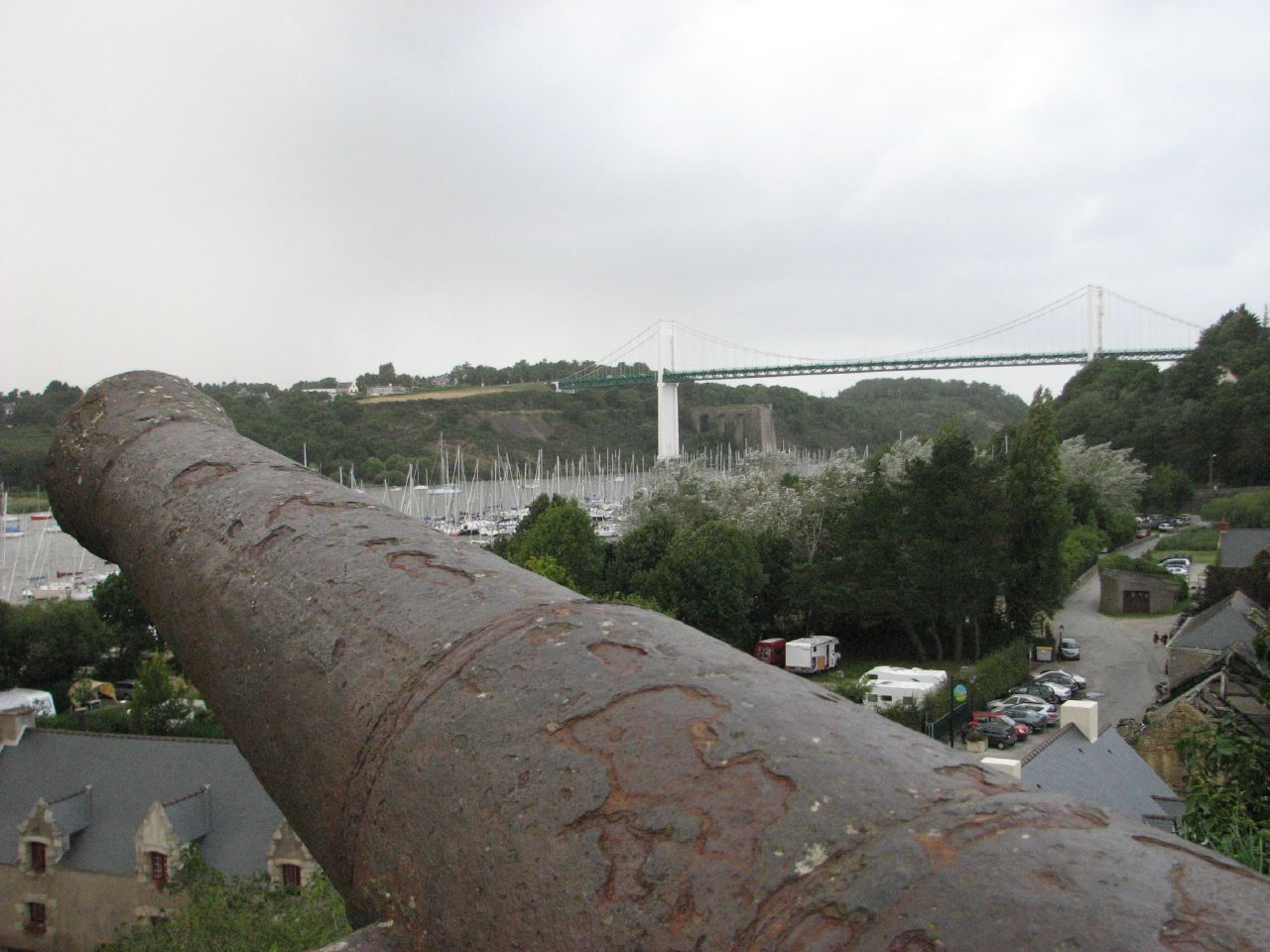
Guns of La Roche-Bernard
