= HMS Essex (1679) =

Ship of the line of the Royal Navy

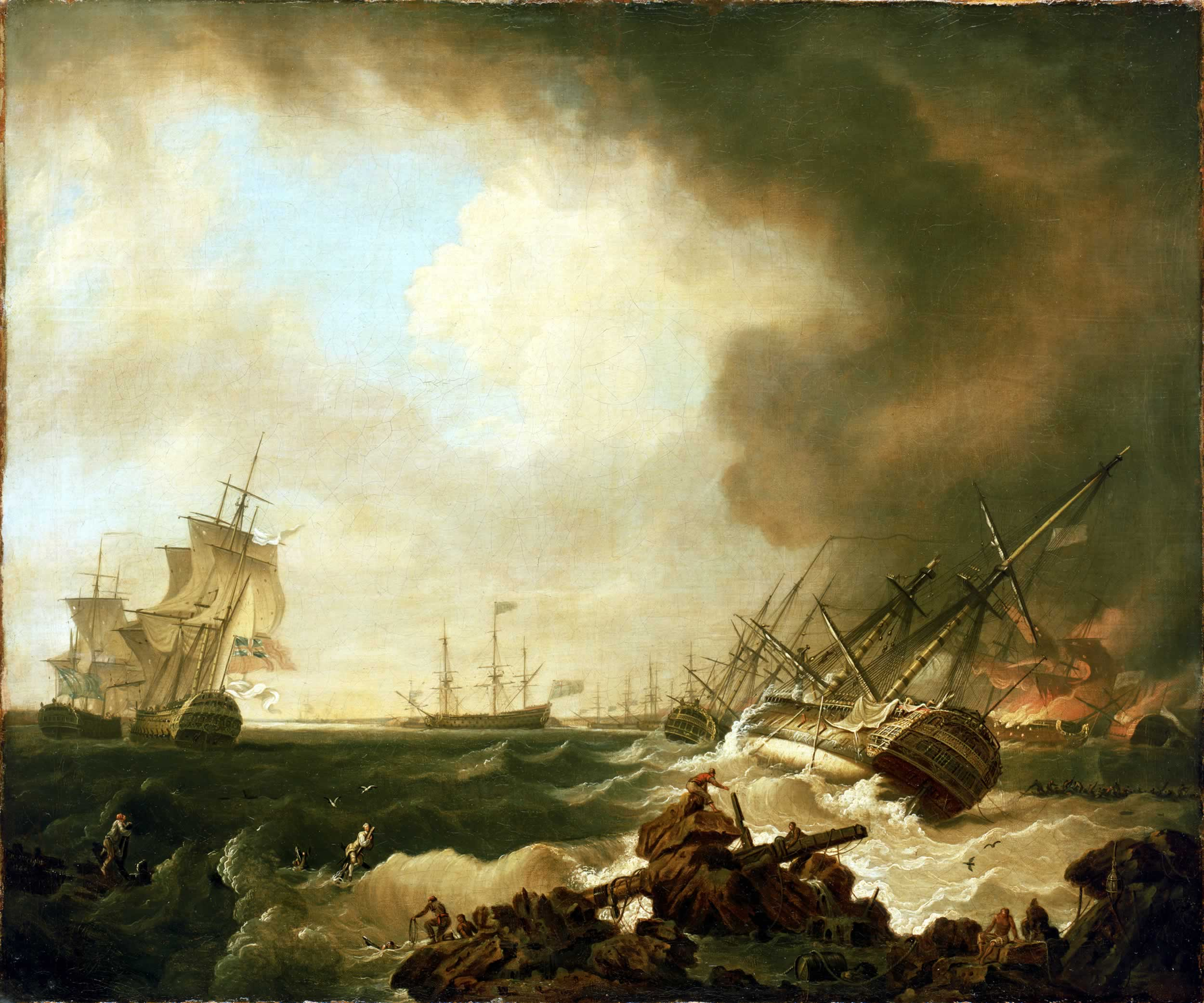
- Battle of Quiberon Bay: the Day After (Richard Wright, 1760) Essex is the more distant ship on its side, to the left of HMS Resolution

History

England
- Name: HMS Essex
- Ordered: 20 February 1678
- Builder: Sir Henry Johnson , Blackwall
- Launched: 1679
- Commissioned: 14 August 1679
- Honours and awards: Barfleur 1692; Vigo 1702; Gibraltar 1704; Velez-Malaga 1704; Passero 1718; Quiberon Bay 1759
- Fate: Wrecked in Quiberon Bay, 21 November 1759

General characteristics as built
- Class & type: 70-gun third rate ship of the line
- Tons burthen: 1,03189/94 tons (bm)
- Length: 150 ft 2 in (45.77 m) gundeck; 120 ft 9 in (36.80 m) keel for tonnage
- Beam: 40 ft (12.19 m)
- Draught: 18 ft 0 in (5.49 m)
- Depth of hold: 16 ft 9.5 in (5.12 m)
- Propulsion: Sails
- Sail plan: Full-rigged ship
- Armament: 1677 Establishment 72/60 guns; 26 × demi-cannons 54 cwt – 9.5 ft (LD); 26 × 12-pdr guns 32 cwt – 9 ft (UD); 10 × sakers 16 cwt – 7 ft (QD); 4 × sakers 16 cwt – 7 ft (Fc); 5 × 5 3-pdr guns 5 cwt – 5 ft (RH)

General characteristics 1700 rebuild
- Class & type: 70-gun third rate ship of the line
- Tons burthen: 1,08852/94 tons (bm)
- Length: 150 ft 4 in (45.82 m) gundeck; 124 ft 0 in (37.80 m) keel for tonnage
- Beam: 40 ft 7.5 in (12.38 m)
- Depth of hold: 16 ft 6 in (5.03 m)
- Propulsion: Sails
- Sail plan: Full-rigged ship
- Armament: 1685 Establishment 70/62 guns; 26 × demi-cannons 54 cwt – 9.5 ft (LD); 26 × demi-culverins (UD); 10 × sakers 16 cwt – 7 ft (QD); 4 × sakers 16 cwt – 7 ft (Fc); 5 × 5 3-pdr guns 5 cwt – 5 ft (RH)

General characteristics 1740 rebuild
- Class & type: 1733 proposals 70-gun third rate ship of the line
- Tons burthen: 1225
- Length: 151 ft (46.02 m) gundeck; 121 ft 10 in (37.13 m) keel for tonnage
- Beam: 43 ft 5 in (13.23 m)
- Depth of hold: 17 ft 9 in (5.41 m)
- Propulsion: Sails
- Sail plan: Full-rigged ship
- Armament: 70 guns 1719 Establishment; 24 × 24-pdr guns (LD); 26 × 12-pdr guns (UD); 14 × 6-pdr guns (QD); 4 × 6-pdr guns (Fc)
- Notes: By 1746 guns reduced to 64 by removing six 6-pounder guns

HMS Essex was a 70-gun third rate built by Sir Henry Johnson of Blackwall in 1678/79. During the War of the English Succession she fought in the last major action. She was rebuilt in 1699/1700. During the War of Spanish Succession she fought at Vigo Bay, the Capture of Gibraltar and Velez Malaga. She also fought at the Battle off Passero in 1718. She was rebuilt again in 1736–40. She was in action off Toulon in 1744. She was active in the Channel and against French ports during the Seven Years' War. She fought at Quiberon Bay in 1759. She was wrecked in Quiberon Bay in November 1759.

She was the second vessel to bear the name Essex since it was used for a 60-gun ship built at Deptford in 1653 and captured by the Dutch at the Battle of the Galloper Sand (the Four Days’ Battle) in June 1666.

HMS Essex was awarded the Battle Honours Barfleur 1692, Vigo 1702, Gibraltar 1704, and Velez-Malaga 1704, Passero 1718, and Quiberon Bay 1759.

== Construction and specifications ==
She was ordered on 20 February 1678 to be built under contract by Sir Henry Johnson of Blackwall on the River Thames. She was launched in 1679. Her dimensions were a gundeck of 150 feet 2 inches (45.77 metres) with a keel of 120 feet 9 inches (36.80 metres) for tonnage calculation with a breadth of 40 feet 1 inch (12.22 metres) and a depth of hold of 16 feet 9.5 inches (5.12 metres). Her builder's measure tonnage was calculated as 1,03189/94 tons (burthen). Her draught was 18 feet 0 inches (5.49 metres).

Her initial gun armament was in accordance with the 1677 Establishment with 72/60 guns consisting of twenty-six demi-cannons (54 cwt, 9.5 ft) on the lower deck, twenty-six 12-pounder guns (32 cwt, 9 ft) on the upper deck, ten sakers (16 cwt, 7 ft) on the quarterdeck and four sakers (16 cwt, 7 ft) on the foc's'le with four 3-pounder guns (5 cwt, 5 ft) on the poop deck or roundhouse. By 1688 she would carry 70 guns as per the 1685 Establishment . Her initial manning establishment would be for a crew of 460/380/300 personnel.

== Commissioned service ==
=== Service 1679-1698 ===
She was commissioned on 14 August 1679 under the command of Captain John Perryman for delivery to Chatham. In 1689 she was under the command of Captain Anthony Hastings followed in 1690 by Captain John Bridges. She fought in the Battle of Barfleur in Rear (Blue) Squadron, Rear Division from 19 to 22 May 1692. In 1693 she was under Captain William Wright. In 1697 she was under Captain Basil Beaumont followed by Captain Christopher Fogge. During this time, she sailed with the Dunkirk Squadron. She was to be rebuilt in Rotherhithe in 1699/1700.

=== Rebuild Rotherhithe 1698-1700 ===
She was ordered on 23 September 1698 to be rebuilt under contract by John & Richard Wells of Rotherhithe. Her keel was laid in November 1698 and launched in May 1700. Her dimensions were a gundeck of 150 feet 4 inches (45.82 metres) with a keel of 124 feet 0 inches (37.80 metres) for tonnage calculation with a breadth of 40 feet 7.5 inches (12.38 metres) and a depth of hold of 16 feet 6 inches (5.03 metres). Her builder's measure tonnage was calculated as 1,08852/94 tons (burthen). She probably retained her armament as stated in the 1685 Establishment, though it is unclear if her armament was changed to the 1703 Establishment later. It is known that when completed her gun armament total at least 70 guns.

=== Service 1702-1736 ===
HMS Essex was commissioned in 1702 under the command of Captain John Hubbard for service with Sir George Rooke's Fleet. In August she was assigned to Rear-Admiral Sir Stafford Fairborne's Squadron. Admiral Fairborne's Squadron was detached to reconnoiter Corunna for French ships on the 22nd of July. Finding nothing they rejoined Sir George Rooke's Fleet at sea on 8 August. The Fleet arrived at the Bay of Bulls (north of Cadiz) on the 12th. After many meetings and much indecision, the Fleet departed on 18 September. On 21 September it was learned that a French Fleet and Spanish treasure ships were in the vicinity of Vigo Bay. On the 11th a council of war was held to determine the ships that would initially enter the bay. She fought in the Battle of Vigo as the Flagship of Rear-Admiral Fairborne on 12 October 1702Winfield 2009, Fleet Actions, 7.1 Battle of Vigo Bay. All French and Spanish ships were either taken or destroyed.

In 1703 she was assigned Captain Hubbard once more sailing with Admiral Sir Cloudisley Shovell. She was in the Capture of Gibraltar on 23 July 1704. She was in the attack on the town and south bastion. Gibraltar surrendered on the 24th. During the defense of Gibraltar, she participated in the Battle of Velez Malaga on 13 August 1704. She suffered 13 killed with 36 wounded during the battle. In 1706 she was under the command of Captain Henry Lumley operating with Sir John Leake's Fleet in the Mediterranean. In 1708 she was under the command of Captain John Smith. She spent the winter of 1708/09 in the Mediterranean. Captain Vincent Cutter had command in 1710 until his death in April. Captain Richard Leake took over command and served with the Main Fleet. In 1711 she was under Captain Kerryll Roffey for service in the English Channel.

She underwent a great repair at Chatham Dockyard costing £12,727 (Note: A total cost accounting for inflation of approximately £2,149,100 in today's money) during October 1711 and January 1714. She was commissioned in 1715 under Captain Charles Strickland for service in the Baltic. In the Spring of 1718, she was fitted for service in the Mediterranean. When completed she was under the command of Captain Richard Rowzier then sailed to the Mediterranean. She fought in the Battle off Passero on 11 April 1718. During the battle she took the 36-gun Spanish ship Juno. Her next duty was as a guard ship at Sheerness under Captain Christopher O’Brien in 1721. She paid off at Chatham in 1723. She was dismantled at Woolwich completing in May 1736 with the intent for rebuilding.

=== Rebuild at Woolwich Dockyard 1736-1741 ===
She was ordered on 20 May 1736 to be rebuilt at Woolwich Dockyard under the guidance of Master Shipwright John Hayward. Her keel was laid on 20 August 1736 and launched on 21 February 1741. Her dimensions were a gundeck of 151 feet 0 inches (46.02 metres) with a keel of 121 feet 10 inches (37.13 metres) for tonnage calculation with a breadth of 43 feet 6 inches (13.26 metres) and a depth of hold of 17 feet 9 inches (5.41 metres). Her builder's measure tonnage was calculated as 1,22626/94 tons (burthen).

Her armament was in accordance with the 1733 Establishment and consisted of twenty-six 24-pounder guns on the lower deck (LD), twenty-six 12-pounder guns on the upper deck (UD), fourteen 6-pounder guns on the quarterdeck (QD), and four 6-pounder guns on the foc's'le (Fc). During the late 1740s when she was reduced to a 64-gun ship she lost six 6-pounder guns (four from the QD and two from the Fc).

She was completed on 15 May 1741 at a cost of £25,765.7.3d. (Note: A total cost accounting for inflation of approximately £4,202,200 in today's money)

=== Service 1741-1759 ===
She was commissioned in February 1741 under the command of Captain Nathaniel Robson for service with Sir John Norris's Fleet. She sailed with Sir John Norris to the Mediterranean during 1742/43. In 1744 she was under Captain Richard Norris. She fought in the Battle of Toulon on 11 February 1744. From 1745 to 1747 she was under the command of Captain Richard Hughes serving in the Mediterranean. She was surveyed on 29 January 1749 and again on 21 June 1750. She underwent a middling repair at Woolwich Dockyard under Admiralty Order (AO) 19 April 1750 and AO 21 June 1750 for a cost of £13,386.14.10d (Note: A total cost accounting for inflation of approximately £2,183,200 in today's money) between August 1750 and October 1751.

She was recommissioned in March 1755 under Captain Robert Harland for service with Admiral Sir Edward Hawke's Fleet. In April 1756, after the outbreak of the Seven Years' War, she was sent to reinforce Admiral Hawke's Fleet. In the Summer of 1756, she was assigned to Sir Edward Boscawen's Fleet. She was the Flagship of Sir Charles Knowles in November 1756. She captured the privateers: La Sainte-Barbe on 30 December 1756, Le Puisieux on 3 August 1757, Le Comte de Herouville on 22 July 1757, and the 18-gun St Malo ship Le Comte de St Florentine on 3 August 1757. Later in 1757 Captain John (or James) Campbell took command. She served with Admiral Hawke's Fleet in October then she was with Cornish's Squadron in November/December. She attacked with HMS Pluto and HMS Proserpine a French convoy and took the 22-gun La Galatee plus the privateer Le Rostan and a transport on 7 April 1758. In mid-1758 Captain R. Darvil temporarily took command. She was the flagship of Commodore the Honourable Richard Howe during operations against St Malo, France, Cherbourg, and St Cas between the months of June and September 1758. During the attack on St Malo in June Commodore Howe shifted his flag to the Success. For the operation at Cherbourg on 7/8 August, Commodore Howe shifted his Flag to the Pallas. By 1759 she was again under the command of Captain Campbell. In June she was temporarily under the command of Lieutenant George Johnstone. In July 1759 she was under the command of Captain Lucius O’Brien. She fought at the Battle of Quiberon Bay on 20 November 1759.

== Notable Crew Members ==
Sailors of African heritage served alongside Europeans on Royal Navy ships in a number of capacities in the 18th century; as navigators, translators, gunners, deckhands and ‘top men’, working at heights in the rigging. They were also employed as boatswains, carpenters and cooks, the servants of officers, and a few were promoted to captain.

=== Kingston ===
A young man of African heritage known as George Kingston, joined the crew of HMS Essex as an Orderly, on the 25th of December 1709, whilst she was docked at Chatham for repairs. The fact he was recruited by John Smith, who captained the ship between 1708 and February 1710, suggests Kingston was also a seasoned sailor. A letter written by Smith to the Navy that winter lists 27 dead crewmen lost from the Essex out of a crew of around 440, which would have forced Smith to take on new recruits before the ship was ready to sail again.

Kingston was an enslaved man, perhaps of Jamaican origin, as suggested by his nickname (Kingston is the capital of Jamaica). Hours before he joined the crew of the Essex on Christmas day, George Kingston had run away from his ‘owner’ in London and made his way to Chatham. The fact he arrived the same day suggests the 34 mile journey to Chatham was pre planned (perhaps on board another boat). On the 14th of January 1710, after he had spent just a few weeks on board HMS Essex, Captain Smith was made aware that George Kingston was not a free man. He was discharged from the Royal Navy and was returned to his "owner" in London by the 20th, but escaped again the same night.

Kingston had taken steps to plan for freedom, believing (like many others) that converting to Christianity would secure his status as a free man and give him access to the support of the parish, he had himself baptised by a man called Yates in the church of St Martin in the Fields, in the same parish as York Buildings. His baptism record is dated the 25th of November - exactly a month before he ran away - it confirms his full name was Thomas George Kingston and that he was 18 years old.

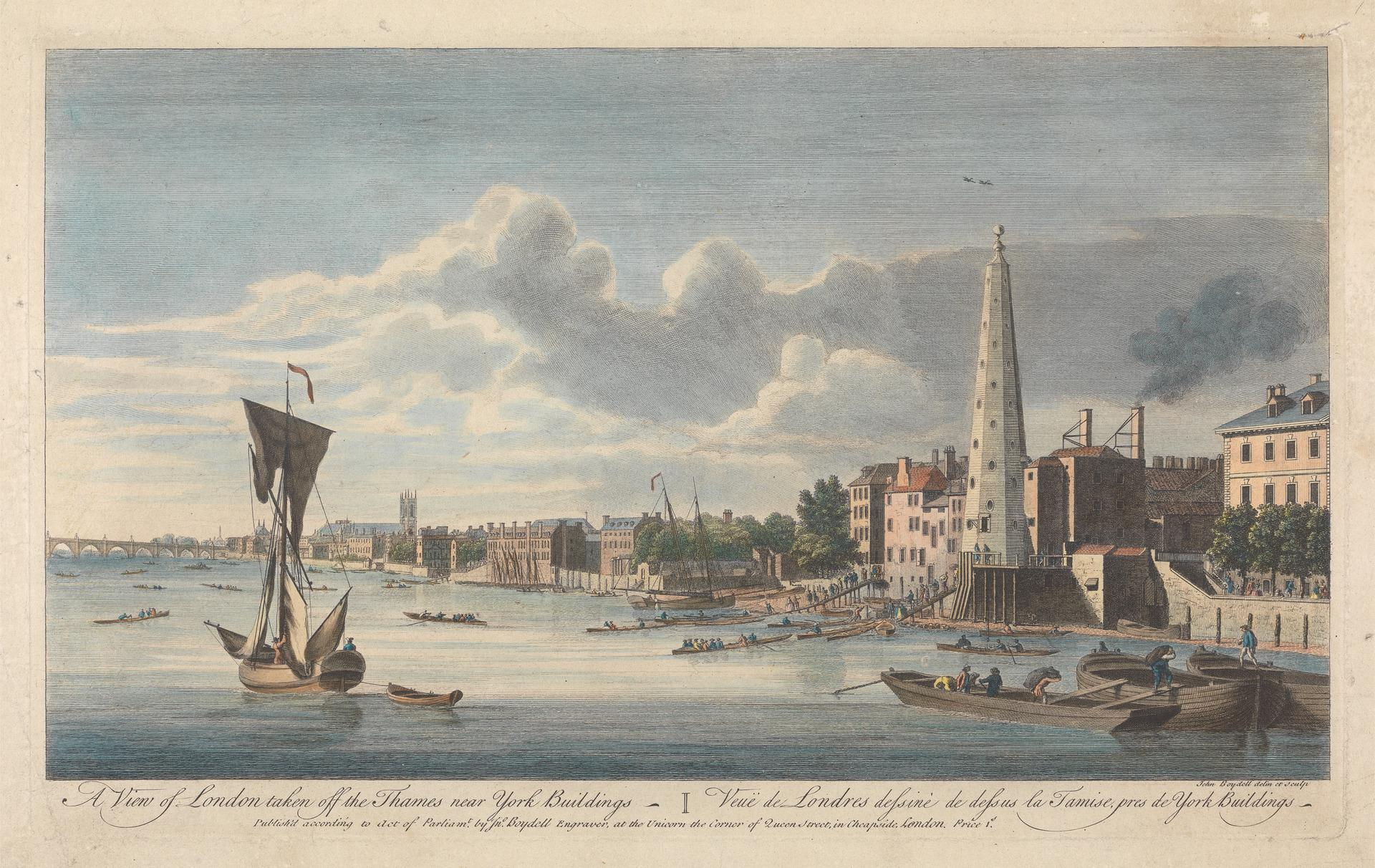
A View of London from York Building by John Boydell Late 1700s

“Whereas a young Man about the age of 20, known about York-Buildings by the Name of Kingston, Ran away from his Master on Christmas Day and enter’d himself on Board her Majesty’s Ship Essex at Chatham, was upon due Application discharg’d the said Ship and brought to London on Friday the 20th Instant, but went away agen the same Night, whoever gives notice of him to Mr. Morris at Will’s Coffee-house in Covent-Garden, so as he may be apprehended, shall have a Guineas Reward, or if brought thither shall be paid 2 Guineas with Charges by the said Mr. Morris. [...] carrys about him a Certificate of being Baptiz’d by Mr. Yates Reader of St. Martin’s in the Fields. Or if he’ll Return to his Service in Ten Days he shall be kindly receiv’d.”

This newspaper advert, calling for the public to help locate and retrieve George Kingston was published on the 23rd of January, just three days after he ran for the second time, and again on the 10th and 22 February, implying that his previous "owners" were eager to see him returned. Kingston’s ‘owner’ was in all probability a naval captain, who regarded him as a key member of the crew. Only the first advert calls for Kingston to return within 10 days, implying that his "owner" will have sailed by this time. Ship’s captains, and crew, led transient lives coming and going with the tide, many used London’s coffee houses as points of contact whilst at sea, like Mr Morris at Wills Coffee House.

Kingston was described, in the newspaper adverts, as being well known around the area of the York Buildings Company, which was a waterworks company until it shifted focus in 1719. With connections, it is possible that Kingston found support from the parish in which he had been baptised, though he risked being seen and reported by those prepared to profit from his escape and collect the reward offered.

== Loss ==
On 21 November 1759 following the battle, she was wrecked in Quiberon Bay. Essex had been attempting to chase the French Flagship Soleil Royal but both vessels went ashore and were wrecked.
