= HMS Swiftsure (1750) =

Ship of the line of the Royal Navy

- Swiftsure

History

Great Britain
- Name: HMS Swiftsure
- Ordered: 31 August 1745
- Builder: John Hollond, Deptford Dockyard
- Laid down: 26 January 1747
- Launched: 25 May 1750
- Commissioned: 27 July 1750
- In service: 1755–1763
- Out of service: 1763–1773
- Fate: Sold, 2 June 1773

General characteristics
- Class & type: 1745 Establishment 70-gun third rate ship of the line
- Tons burthen: 1426 42/94(bm)
- Length: 160 ft (48.8 m) (gundeck); 131 ft 4 in (40.0 m) (keel)
- Beam: 45 ft 2 in (13.8 m)
- Depth of hold: 19 ft 4 in (5.9 m)
- Propulsion: Sails
- Sail plan: Full-rigged ship
- Complement: 520
- Armament: 70 guns: Gundeck: 26 × 32 pdrs; Upper gundeck: 28 × 18 pdrs; Quarterdeck: 12 × 9 pdrs; Forecastle: 4 × 9 pdrs

HMS Swiftsure was a 70-gun third-rate ship of the line of the Royal Navy, launched in 1755 and in active service during the Seven Years' War. After a distinguished career at sea she was decommissioned in 1763 and sold into private hands ten years later.

== Construction ==
Swiftsure was built at Deptford Dockyard to the specifications of the 1745 Establishment, and launched on 25 May 1750.

== Service ==
Swiftsure was commissioned into the Royal Navy in August 1755, under Captain Augustus Keppel. In 1756 her command was transferred to Captain Matthew Buckle, and she was assigned first to the fleet under Admiral Henry Osborn, and then to that of Edward Boscawen. In company with HMS Monmouth she engaged and captured the French ship of the line Foudroyant in 1758, and towed her to join the fleet of Admiral Henry Osborn at Cartagena. In 1759 she was again with Boscawen at the Battle of Lagos, and at the Battle of Quiberon Bay later that year, and at the capture of Belle Île in 1761. She was sold on 2 June 1773.
