= HMS Assistance (1747) =

Ship of the line of the Royal Navy

History

Great Britain
- Name: HMS Assistance
- Ordered: 6 August 1745
- Builder: Ledger, River Medway
- Launched: 22 December 1747
- Fate: Sold, 1773

General characteristics
- Class & type: 1745 Establishment 50-gun fourth rate ship of the line
- Tons burthen: 1063 bm
- Length: 150 ft (45.7 m) (gundeck)
- Beam: 42 ft 8 in (13.0 m)
- Depth of hold: 18 ft 6 in (5.6 m)
- Propulsion: Sails
- Sail plan: Full-rigged ship
- Armament: 50 guns: Gundeck: 22 × 24-pounders; Upper gundeck: 22 × 12-pounders; Quarterdeck: 4 × 6-pounders; Forecastle: 2 × 6-pounders

HMS Assistance was a 50-gun fourth rate ship of the line of the Royal Navy, built at a private yard on the River Medway to the draught specified by the 1745 Establishment, and launched on 22 December 1747.

Assistance served until 1773, when she was sold out of the navy.
