= French ship Formidable =

A number of ships of the French Navy have borne the name Formidable, honouring the trait of inspiring fear in the enemy. Among them:

- Formidable (1691–1714), a 96-gun ship of the line
- Formidable (1751–1759), an 80-gun ship of the line, captured by the Royal Navy and commissioned as HMS Ham.
- Formidable (1795–1814), ex-Marat, a Téméraire-class ship of the line
- Formidable (1795–1805), an 80-gun ship of the line
- Formidable (1824–1836)
- Formidable (1885), an early battleship

[Note that in the early summer of 1795 there were two French ships of the line which bore the same name for three weeks.]

== See also ==
- HMS Formidable
