= French ship Héros (1752) =

Ship of the line of the French Navy

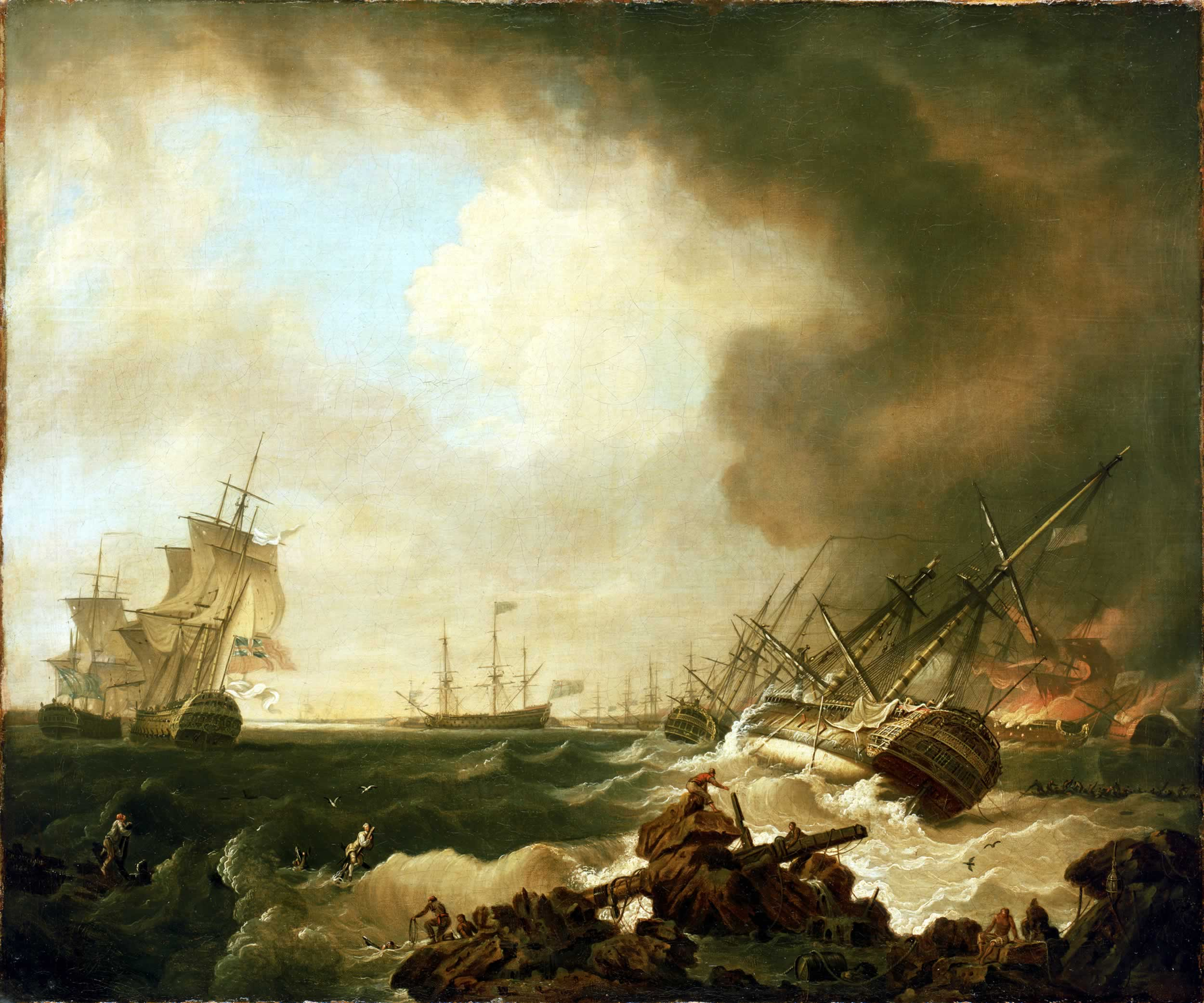
- Aftermath of the Battle of Quiberon Bay, by Richard Wright

History

France
- Name: Héros
- Builder: Brest arsenal
- Laid down: November 1750
- Launched: 1 September 1752
- Completed: October 1752
- Fate: Scuttled on 21 November 1759

General characteristics
- Displacement: 2800 tonneaux
- Tons burthen: 1500 port tonneaux
- Length: 164 ft (50 m)
- Beam: 43 ft (13 m)
- Draught: 20 ft 6 in (6.25 m)
- Propulsion: sail
- Complement: 750 men
- Armament: Lower battery: 28 × 36-pounder guns; Upper battery: 30 × 18-pounder guns; Gaillards: 16 × 8-pounder guns

Héros ("hero") was a 74-gun ship of the line of the French Navy, built by Joseph Chapelle at Brest and launched on 1 September 1752.

In 1755, Héros, under captain de Kermabon, took part in the Canadian campaign in the Bullion de Montlouet squadron.

In April 1756, Héros sailed from Brest, armed en flute, and under the command of Captain Beaussier de Lisle. She was part of a squadron of three transports and three frigates taking troops to Fort Louisbourg and supplies to Ile Royale during the French and Indian War. In 1756, Beaussier de Lisle brought six ships to Quebec carrying Montcalm and 1,300 troops as reinforcements. On 26 July 1756, homeward bound, as Héros was leaving Louisbourg, she encountered two British ships. In the ensuing engagement, the British were repelled. However, Beaussier de Lisle was wounded.

On 14 November 1759, Héros sortied from Brest with the squadron under the command of marechal de Conflans. The squadron consisted of 20 transports and five frigates, and was attempting to land troops at Comouailles. Six days later the squadron encountered Admiral Hawke's 29 vessels outside Quiberon. During the Battle of Quiberon Bay, Héros attempted to escape but was wrecked off le Croisic and scuttled. On 21 November the British set fire to the wreck.
