= 1745 Establishment =

Formalised set of dimensions for Royal Navy vessels

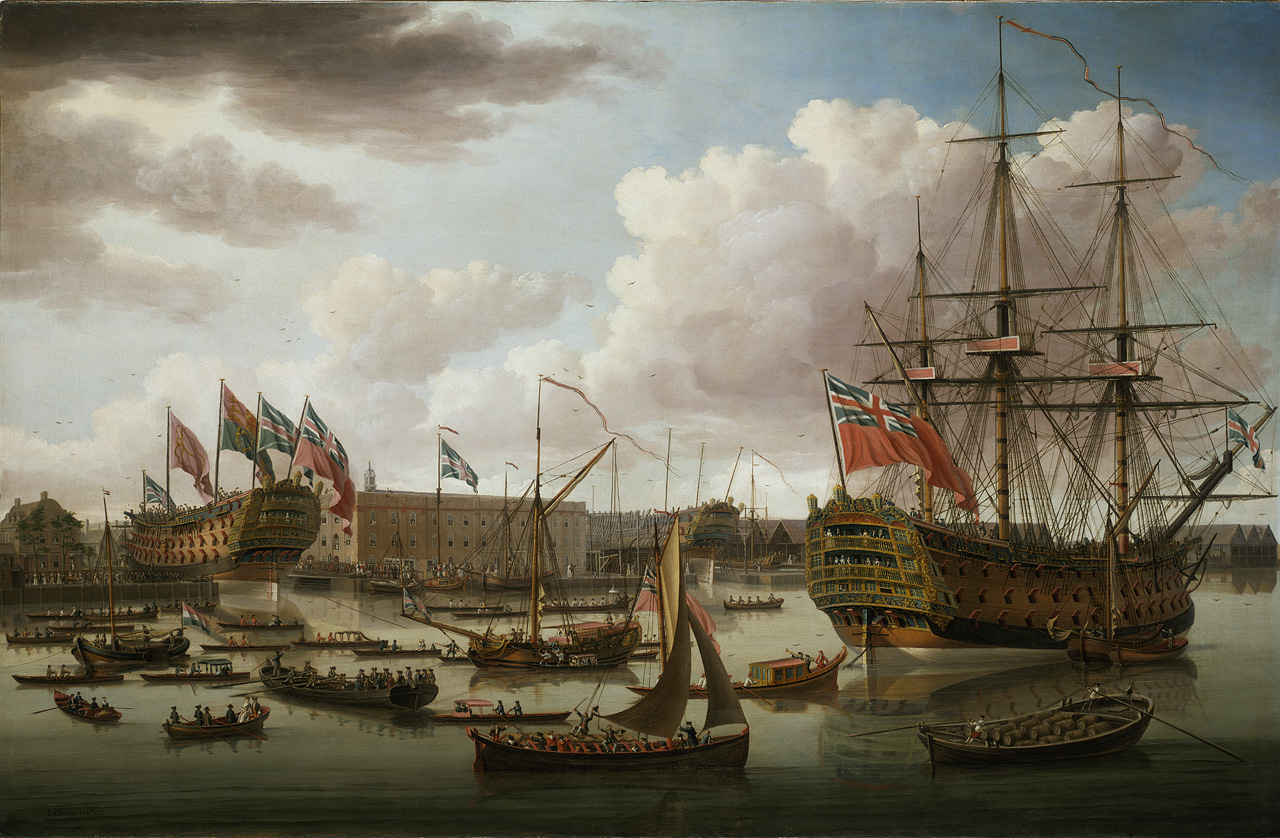
- HMS Royal George at right, shown fictitiously at the launch of HMS Cambridge

Class overview
- Operators: Royal Navy; French Navy
- Preceded by: 1719 Establishment
- Succeeded by: Sandwich class (second rate); Valiant class (third rate); Dublin class (third rate); Edgar class (fourth rate); Essex class (third rate)
- Built: 1747–66

The 1745 Establishment was the third and final formal establishment of dimensions for ships to be built for the Royal Navy. It completely superseded the previous 1719 Establishment, which had subsequently been modified in 1733 and again in 1741 (but not formally replaced on either occasion). Although partially intended to correct the problems of the ships built to the earlier Establishments, the ships of the 1745 Establishment proved just as unsatisfactory, and important changes in the make-up of the Admiralty and Navy Boards finally led to the end of the establishment era by around 1751.

== Origins ==
When the 1706 Establishment had come into effect, British naval architecture had been set on a path of conservatism that caused stagnation in the advance of shipbuilding in Great Britain. Over the course of the existence of the 1706 and 1719 Establishments, the sizes of ships had remained relatively unchanged: the gundeck length of a 70-gun third rate of 1706 was 150 ft (45.7 m), compared with 151 ft (46.0 m) in 1733. By comparison, the 70-gun French ship Ferme captured by the Royal Navy in 1702 was 156 ft 2 in (47.6 m), and the 70-gun Magnanime of 1744, captured in 1748 was 173 ft 7 in (52.9 m). This was almost as long as the 175 ft (53.3 m) to which British first rates were to be built according to the 1741 proposals.

With the end of Robert Walpole's government in 1742, the Board of Admiralty was re–organised, and the civilian Earl of Winchilsea was appointed First Lord. Under the new administration, there were some half-hearted attempts at reform, with the ordering of the 90-gun Namur to be razeed to 74 guns in response to the increasing French and Spanish practice of building 74-gun ships, and an experiment in building larger ships for their class which resulted in the construction of Bristol and Rochester.

The Duke of Bedford, again a civilian, was appointed First Lord in December 1744. He relied upon Rear-Admiral George Anson, who had refused promotion to flag rank under the previous First Lord. The fiasco that was the Battle of Toulon highlighted many of the problems in British shipbuilding, with several ships unable to open gunports due to a combination of a lack of stability and insufficient height of the ports above the waterline. It was observed by Commodore Charles Knowles that the British 70-gun ships were 'little superior to [the French] ships of 52 guns.' Many of the fleet's problems were blamed on Sir Jacob Acworth, the Surveyor of the Navy since 1715, and an unsuccessful attempt to remove him was mounted by one of the members of the Board of Admiralty, Henry Legge.

For the previous Establishments, the dimensions had been decided upon through consultation with the Surveyor and senior shipwrights; instead in June 1745 the Admiralty took the lead when it decided to deal with the problem of ship sizes, and set up a committee to review proposals made by the Navy Board. The original purpose of the Establishments was to standardise the fleet, but because ships had been built and rebuilt at various times to varying established dimensions, there was little more standardisation than had been present before the 1706 Establishment came into being. The new Establishment of 1745 was intended to correct this situation, and at the same time solve the issues with British ships that had been the cause of complaint by sea officers for several years.

The Admiralty had intended that the 80-gun ships should no longer be built, as they lacked maneuverability and stability, and their lower gunports were so close to the waterline that they could not be opened in anything above a calm sea. The committee the Admiralty had set up disagreed with their assessment however, and a suggestion to switch to 74-gun ships in lieu of the 80s was rejected. The size of ships was to be limited according to the depth of water available in the country's ports, and so even the 90-gun ships were to remain smaller than some French and Spanish 74s. Despite these setbacks, the Admiralty had achieved much greater increases in the sizes of ships than with the previous establishments. Furthermore, the ship types of pre-1741 were restored, with the 64-gun vessel returned to 70 guns, and the 58-gun vessels to 60.

Earlier establishments had merely laid out the principal dimensions for each type of warship from the 100-gun first rates down to the 20-gun sixth rates, although with effect from the 1719 Establishment this was augmented by defining the sizes and thicknesses of wood to be used in the construction. These establishments had left the actual design of each vessel to the Master Shipwright in each Naval Dockyard, with the Surveyor of the Navy responsible only for common designs for those ships built by contract by mercantile shipbuilders. However, under the new 1745 Establishment the responsibility for preparing designs ("draughts") for all ships was given to the Surveyor of the Navy, with the Master Shipwrights now responsible only for constructing ships to those common Surveyor's designs for each vessel type.

Additionally, control over the Establishments was passed from the Admiralty to the Privy Council, a move intended to remove the possibility of ongoing change. Despite the rejection of their proposal that 74-gun ships should replace 80s in the new Establishment, Admiralty did succeed in having Culloden, which was building as an 80, modified to be completed as a 74, though she was never considered a particularly successful ship, and was the smallest 74-gun ship of the 18th century.

== Confirmation ==
In a joint letter sent on 5 August 1945 from Deptford Dockyard to "the Right Hon Sir John Norris and the rest of the Gentlemen appointed to fix on an Establishment for Building His Majesty's Ships", the Surveyor (Allin) and the principal Master Shipwrights (Pierson Lock, John Ward, John Holland and John Poole) wrote: " Pursuant to your Directions of the 8th past [i.e. 8th July], for our preparing and delivering the Principal Scantlings proper for a Ship of each Class to the Royal Navy, according to the Dimensions resolved on by your Honours [on] the 5th and 8th of the Month; the following are in our Opinion proper for Ships Built of the said Dimensions, which is humbly submitted. Your most Obedient Servants [names then followed]"

== Individual ship types ==
A different set of Establishment dimensions was defined for each size of ship, other than the smallest (i.e. the unrated) vessels. In the main (the exceptions being the 64-gun and 58-gun ships, as shown below) the armament remained that set out under the 1743 Establishment of Guns (created by Order of the King in Council, 25 April 1743); this was applied retrospectively to all ships order to be built subsequent to 1 January 1740.

=== First rates of 100 guns ===
General characteristics for 100-gun first rates
- Type: 100-gun first rate ship of the line
- Tons burthen: 1999 70/94 bm
- Length: 178 ft 0 in (54.3 m) (gundeck); 144 ft 6.5 in (44.1 m) (keel)
- Beam: 51 ft 0 in (15.5 m)
- Depth of hold: 21 ft 6 in (6.6 m)
- Complement: 850 officers and men

As provided for under the 1743 Establishment of Guns, the 100-gun first rate was to carry an armament of:

- twenty-eight 42-pounder guns on its lower deck,
- twenty-eight 24-pounder guns on its middle deck,
- twenty-eight 12-pounder guns on its upper deck,
- twelve 6-pounder guns on its quarterdeck, and
- four 6-pounder guns on its forecastle.

=== Second rates of 90 guns ===
General characteristics for 90-gun second rates
- Type: 90-gun second-rate ship of the line
- Tons burthen: 1730 77/94 bm
- Length: 170 ft 0 in (51.8 m) (gundeck); 138 ft 4 in (42.2 m) (keel)
- Beam: 48 ft 6 in (14.8 m)
- Depth of hold: 20 ft 6 in (6.2 m)
- Complement: 750 officers and men

As provided for under the 1743 Establishment of Guns, the 90-gun second rate was to carry an armament of:

- twenty-six 32-pounder guns on its lower deck,
- twenty-six 18-pounder guns on its middle deck,
- twenty-six 12-pounder guns on its upper deck,
- ten 6-pounder guns on its quarterdeck, and
- two 6-pounder guns on its forecastle.

=== Third rates of 80 guns ===
General characteristics for 80-gun third rates
- Type: 80-gun third-rate ship of the line
- Tons burthen: 1585 2/94 bm
- Length: 165 ft 0 in (50.3 m) (gundeck); 134 ft 10.75 in (41.1 m) (keel)
- Beam: 47 ft 0 in (14.3 m)
- Depth of hold: 20 ft 0 in (6.1 m)
- Complement: 650 officers and men

As provided for under the 1743 Establishment of Guns, the 80-gun third rate was to carry an armament of:

- twenty-six 32-pounder guns on its lower deck,
- twenty-six 18-pounder guns on its middle deck,
- twenty-four 9-pounder guns on its upper deck,
- four 6-pounder guns on its quarterdeck, and
- nil guns on its forecastle.

=== Third rates of 70 guns ===
General characteristics for 70-gun third rates
- Type: 70-gun third-rate ship of the line
- Tons burthen: 1414 36/94 bm
- Length: 160 ft 0 in (48.8 m) (gundeck); 131 ft 4 in (40.0 m) (keel)
- Beam: 45 ft 0 in (13.7 m)
- Depth of hold: 19 ft 4 in (5.9 m)
- Complement: 520 officers and men; (470 in 64-gun ship)

The 1743 Establishment of Guns had provided for the former 70-gun third rate to be reduced from 70-gun to 64-gun ships, each with an armament of:

- twenty-six 32-pounder guns on its lower deck,
- twenty-six 18-pounder guns on its upper deck,
- ten 9-pounder guns on its quarterdeck, and
- two 9-pounder guns on its forecastle.

Under the 1745 Establishment they were restored to 70 guns and were to carry an armament of:

- twenty-six 32-pounder guns on its lower deck,
- twenty-eight 18-pounder guns on its upper deck,
- twelve 9-pounder guns on its quarterdeck, and
- four 9-pounder guns on its forecastle.

=== Fourth rates of 60 guns ===
General characteristics for 60-gun fourth rates
- Type: 60-gun fourth-rate ship of the line
- Tons burthen: 1191 41/94 bm
- Length: 150 ft 0 in (45.7 m) (gundeck); 123 ft 0.5 in (37.5 m) (keel)
- Beam: 42 ft 8 in (13.0 m)
- Depth of hold: 18 ft 6 in (5.6 m)
- Complement: 420 officers and men

The 1743 Establishment of Guns had provided for the former 60-gun third rate to be reduced from 60-gun to 58-gun ships, each with an armament of:

- twenty-four 24-pounder guns on its lower deck,
- twenty-four 12-pounder guns on its upper deck,
- eight 6-pounder guns on its quarterdeck, and
- two 6-pounder guns on its forecastle.

Under the 1745 Establishment they were restored to 60 guns and were to carry an armament of:

- twenty-four 24-pounder guns on its lower deck,
- twenty-six 12-pounder guns on its upper deck,
- eight 6-pounder guns on its quarterdeck, and
- two 6-pounder guns on its forecastle.

=== Fourth rates of 50 guns ===
General characteristics for 50-gun fourth rates
- Type: 50-gun fourth-rate ship of the line
- Tons burthen: 1052 47/94 bm
- Length: 144 ft 0 in (43.9 m) (gundeck); 117 ft 8.5 in (35.9 m) (keel)
- Beam: 41 ft 0 in (12.5 m)
- Depth of hold: 17 ft 8 in (5.4 m)
- Complement: 350 officers and men

As provided for under the 1743 Establishment of Guns, the 50-gun fourth rate was to carry an armament of:

- twenty-two 24-pounder guns on its lower deck,
- twenty-two 12-pounder guns on its upper deck,
- four 6-pounder guns on its quarterdeck, and
- two 6-pounder guns on its forecastle.

=== Fifth rates (44-gun) ===
General characteristics for 44-gun fifth rates
- Type: 44-gun fifth-rate ship
- Tons burthen: 814 7/94 bm
- Length: 133 ft 0 in (40.5 m) (gundeck); 108 ft 10 in (33.2 m) (keel)
- Beam: 37 ft 6 in (11.4 m)
- Depth of hold: 16 ft 0 in (4.9 m)
- Complement: 280 officers and men

As provided for under the 1743 Establishment of Guns, the 44-gun fifth rate was to carry an armament of:

- twenty 18-pounder guns on its lower deck,
- twenty 9-pounder guns on its upper deck,
- four 6-pounder guns on its quarterdeck, and
- nil guns on its forecastle.

=== Sixth rates (20-gun or 24-gun) ===
General characteristics for 24-gun sixth rates
- Type: 24-gun sixth-rate ship
- Tons burthen: 508 32/94 bm
- Length: 113 ft 0 in (34.4 m) (gundeck); 93 ft 4 in (28.4 m) (keel)
- Beam: 32 ft 0 in (9.8 m) (1745)
- Depth of hold: 11 ft 0 in (3.4 m) (1745)
- Complement: 160 officers and men

As provided for under the 1743 Establishment of Guns, the 24-gun sixth rate was to carry an armament of:

- two 9-pounder guns on its lower deck (aft),
- twenty 9-pounder guns on its upper deck,
- two 3-pounder guns on its quarterdeck, and
- nil guns on its forecastle.

== Amendments to the 1745 Establishment ==
When the first of the new ships began entering service, it became apparent that they were not so successful a design as had been hoped. Captains complained of their poor sailing qualities, and so the Admiralty sought permission from the Privy Council to make amendments to the designs in 1750. The changes agreed mainly affected the 90, 80 and 60-gun ships, although changes were made to the draughts of all sizes of ships.

By 1752, it was felt necessary to petition the Council for further alterations to be made to the designs, and again in 1754. On this occasion, the Admiralty decided to omit certain details—namely a 2 ft (0.6 m) increase in the length of the 70-gun ships—from their proposals, so as to better the chances of their being accepted. However, by this time it was clear that the ships of the 1745 Establishment were a thorough disappointment.

== End of an era ==
In 1755 Joseph Allin retired from his post as Surveyor of the Navy on ill health. He had been joint Surveyor with Jacob Ackworth until Ackworth's death in 1749, and sole Surveyor thereafter. The Admiralty reacted swiftly and appointed Thomas Slade and William Bateley as the new joint Surveyors, and shortly thereafter two new 70-gun ships were ordered to be built to Slade's draught, which represented a significant increase in size over their predecessors—165 ft 6 in (50.4 m) as opposed to the 162 ft (49.4 m) of the 1754 amendments. Although nominally ordered as 70s, these new third rates were in fact the first of the Dublin-class 74s, and represented the end of the 70-gunner as a ship type on the navy lists. The era of crippling conservatism in British shipbuilding completed its slow death when Anson, by now the First Lord of the Admiralty, had the Navy Board reorganised with people who would support the Admiralty rather than fight with it, as had been the case previously.
