= Battle of Quiberon Bay =

1759 battle of the Seven Years' War

- Part of the Seven Years' War
- Painting of the battle by Richard Paton
Date	20–21 November 1759
Location	Quiberon Bay, Bay of Biscay 47°31′N 3°0′W
Result	British victory

Belligerents
Great Britain	France

Commanders and leaders
Sir Edward Hawke	Hubert de Brienne

Strength
24 ships of the line; 7 frigates; 1 bomb vessel; 2 fireships	21 ships of the line; 3 frigates; 1 corvette; 2 smaller ships

Casualties and losses
300 killed or wounded; 2 ships of the line wrecked	2,520 killed; Unknown wounded or captured; 1 ship of the line captured; 2 ships of the line sunk; 2 ships of the line scuttled; 2 ships of the line wrecked
- Quiberon Bay Battle of Quiberon Bay (Europe)

The Battle of Quiberon Bay (known as the Bataille des Cardinaux by the French) was a decisive naval engagement during the Seven Years' War. It was fought on 20–21 November 1759 between the Royal Navy and the French Navy in Quiberon Bay, off the coast of France near Saint-Nazaire. The battle was the culmination of British efforts to eliminate French naval superiority, which could have given the French the ability to carry out their planned invasion of Great Britain.

In the battle, a British fleet of 24 ships of the line under Admiral of the Blue Sir Edward Hawke tracked down and engaged a French fleet of 21 ships of the line under Chef d'escadre Hubert de Brienne. After hard fighting, the British fleet sank or ran aground six French ships of the line, captured one and scattered the rest, giving the Royal Navy one of its greatest victories, and ending the threat of French invasion for good. The battle cemented the dominance of the Royal Navy for the rest of the war and for the British formed part of the Annus Mirabilis of 1759.

== Background ==
The endemic ill feeling between France and Great Britain during the 18th century turned into open warfare in 1754 and 1755. In 1756 what become known as the Seven Years' War broke out across Europe, pitching France, Austria and Russia against Britain and Prussia. France supported Austria and Russia in a land campaign against Prussia, and launched what it saw as its main effort in a maritime and colonial offensive against Britain. By the beginning of 1759 neither alliance had the advantage, in either the land or sea campaigns, and both were having serious problems financing the war. In 1759 more than 60% of French revenue went to service its debt, causing numerous shortages. The French navy in particular was overstretched and suffered from the lack of a coherent doctrine, exacerbated by the inexperience verging on incompetence of the Secretary of State for the Navy, Nicolas René Berryer, a former chief of police. Meanwhile, Britain's war effort up to early 1756 had been a failure. From the summer of 1757 it came under the control of the assertive new secretary of state for the Southern Department (foreign minister), William Pitt, who imposed a coordinated strategy. By early 1759 this was beginning to bear fruit.

In response to the British successes, Louis XV's minister planned a direct invasion of Britain, which if successful would have decided the war in their favour. An army of 17,000 was collected at Vannes, in the south-east of Brittany, and nearly 100 transports were assembled near Quiberon Bay, plus several warships sailing en flûte, that is with their guns stripped out to allow them to transport more soldiers. In its final form the French plan required these transports to be escorted by the French Navy.

However, at the best of times the French struggled to crew their full fleet with experienced mariners; landsmen could be used, but even a small deficiency in ship handling translated into a significant handicap in a combat situation. Three years into the war, thousands of French seamen were held as prisoners by the British; many more were engaged in speculative, and occasionally lucrative, privateering careers; and the unhealthy conditions, onerous onboard discipline and poor wages, paid late, acted as a strong disincentive to service. The transports also required at least a cadre of skilled men. By the summer of 1759 the French had 73 ships of the line, the largest warships of the era: 30 serving abroad and 43 in home waters. The ships in home waters required an aggregate complement of about 25,000 men; they were more than 9,000 short of this. The 43 French ships in home waters were split between the Atlantic port of Brest (22 ships) and the Mediterranean port of Toulon, with a small number at two ports on the Bay of Biscay: Lorient and Rochefort. The British had 40 ships of the line in home waters, and a further 15 in their Mediterranean Fleet, which was based in Gibraltar.

Brest was the obvious starting point for the expedition: it was a major port; it was well placed with regard to the prevailing winds; and departure from it minimised the sailing distance and time to the proposed landing site. However, Brest was at the end of a long and relatively infertile peninsula, which made supporting a large number of men there difficult; supplies of food had to come in by sea and were vulnerable to the British blockade. A typhoid epidemic in Brest during 1757–1758 killed over 4,000 French seamen, greatly exacerbating their shortage of experienced sailors. In addition, there was fear of a recurrence of the typhus outbreak. Therefore, the army assembled at Vannes and its transports gathered around the Gulf of Morbihan; the terrain was more fertile, the anchorage was large and sheltered, and men and supplies could readily be despatched from Bordeaux, Rochefort, Nantes, or Orléans.

In August, the French Mediterranean Fleet under Jean-François de La Clue-Sabran attempted to break out past Gibraltar into the Atlantic. The British Mediterranean Fleet under Edward Boscawen caught them and a two-day battle resulted in three French ships of the line being captured, two destroyed, and five blockaded in neutral Cádiz; two escaped the battle to reach Rochefort. The five French ships in Cadiz were blockaded by Boscawen's second-in-command, Thomas Brodrick. Five of Boscawen's victorious ships were transferred to Admiral of the Blue Sir Edward Hawke's fleet, off Brest.

== Prelude ==
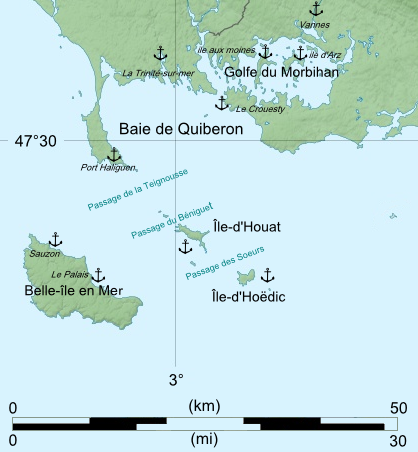
Map of Quiberon Bay

Over the course of 1759, Hawke's fleet maintained a close blockade on the French coast in the vicinity of Brest. In that year, the French had made plans to invade England and Scotland, and had accumulated transports and troops around the Loire estuary. The defeat of the Mediterranean fleet at the Battle of Lagos in August made the invasion plans impossible, but Choiseul still contemplated a plan for Scotland, and so the fleet was ordered to escape the blockade and collect the transports assembled in the Gulf of Morbihan.

During the first week of November, a westerly gale came up and, after three days, the ships of Hawke's blockade were forced to run for Torbay on the south coast of England. Robert Duff was left behind in Quiberon Bay, with a squadron of five 'fifties' (ships of the line with 50 cannons) and nine frigates to keep an eye on the transports. In the meantime, a small squadron from the West Indies joined Chef d'escadre Hubert de Brienne in Brest and, when an easterly wind came on the 14th, de Brienne slipped out. He was sighted by HMS Actaeon which had remained on station off Brest despite the storms but which failed to rendezvous with Hawke, by HMS Juno and Swallow which tried to warn Duff but were apparently chased off by the French, and by the victualler Love and Unity returning from Quiberon, which sighted the French fleet at 2 pm on the 15th, 70 miles west of Belle-Isle. She met Hawke the next day and he sailed hard for Quiberon into a SSE gale. Meanwhile, HMS Vengeance had arrived in Quiberon Bay the night before to warn Duff and he had put his squadron to sea in the teeth of a WNW gale.

== Battle ==
Tracks of British and French fleets

Having struggled with unfavourable winds, de Brienne had slowed down on the night of the 19th in order to arrive at Quiberon at dawn. Twenty miles off Belleisle he sighted seven of Duff's squadron. Once he realised that this was not the main British fleet, he gave chase. Duff split his ships to the north and south, with the French van and centre in pursuit, whilst the rearguard held off to windward to watch some strange sails appearing from the west. The French broke off the pursuit but were still scattered as Hawke's fleet came into sight. HMS Magnanime sighted the French at 8:30 and Hawke gave the signal for line abreast.

De Brienne was faced with a choice, to fight in his current disadvantageous position in high seas and a "very violent" WNW wind, or take up a defensive position in Quiberon Bay and dare Hawke to come into the labyrinth of shoals and reefs. About 9 am Hawke gave the signal for general chase along with a new signal for the first 7 ships to form a line ahead and, in spite of the weather and the dangerous waters, set full sail. By 2:30 de Brienne rounded Les Cardinaux, the rocks at the end of the Quiberon peninsula that give the battle its name in French. The first shots were heard as he did so, although Sir John Bentley in Warspite claimed that they were fired without his orders. However the British were starting to overtake the rear of the French fleet even as their van and centre made it to the safety of the bay.

Just before 4 pm the battered Formidable surrendered to the Resolution, just as Hawke himself rounded The Cardinals. Kersaint attempted to come to the aid of de Brienne, but Thésée performed her turn without closing her lower gunports; water rushed into the gundeck, and she capsized with only 22 survivors. Superbe also capsized, and the badly damaged Héros struck her flag to Viscount Howe before running aground on the Four Shoal during the night.

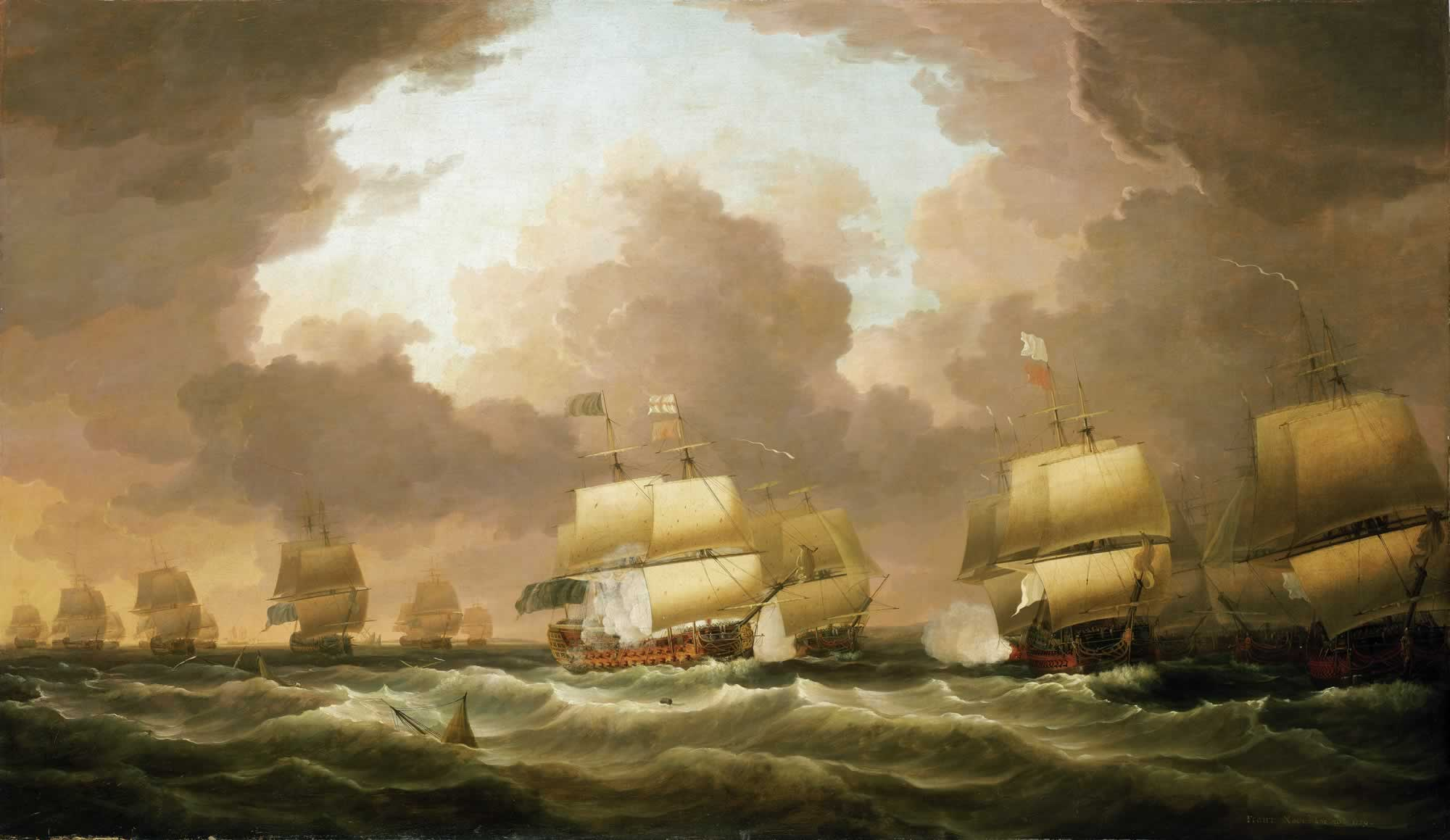
The Battle of Quiberon Bay by Dominic Serres, 1779

Meanwhile, the wind shifted to the NW, further confusing de Brienne's half-formed line as they tangled together in the face of Hawke's daring pursuit. De Brienne tried unsuccessfully to resolve the muddle, but in the end decided to put to sea again. His flagship, Soleil Royal, headed for the entrance to the bay just as Hawke was coming in on Royal George. Hawke saw an opportunity to rake Soleil Royal, but Intrépide interposed herself and took the fire. Meanwhile, Soleil Royal had fallen to leeward and was forced to run back and anchor off Croisic, away from the rest of the French fleet. By now it was about 5 pm and darkness had fallen, so Hawke made the signal to anchor.

During the night eight French ships managed to do what Soleil Royal had failed to do, to navigate through the shoals to the safety of the open sea, and escape to Rochefort. Seven ships and the frigates were in the Vilaine estuary (just off the map above, to the east), but Hawke dared not attack them in the stormy weather. The French jettisoned their guns and gear and used the rising tide and northwesterly wind to escape over the sandbar at the bottom of the river Vilaine. One of these ships was wrecked, and the remaining six were trapped throughout 1760 by a blockading British squadron and only later managed to break out and reach Brest in 1761/1762. The badly damaged Juste was lost as she made for the Loire, 150 of her crew surviving the ordeal, and Resolution grounded on the Four Shoal during the night.

Soleil Royal tried to escape to the safety of the batteries at Croisic, but Essex pursued her with the result that both were wrecked on the Four Shoal beside Héros. On the 22nd the gale moderated, and three of Duff's ships were sent to destroy the beached ships. De Brienne set fire to Soleil Royal while the British burned Héros. Ultimately, the battle resulted in the French suffering 2,520 men killed and an unknown number being wounded or captured, while Hawke's fleet suffered just 300 killed or wounded.

== Aftermath ==
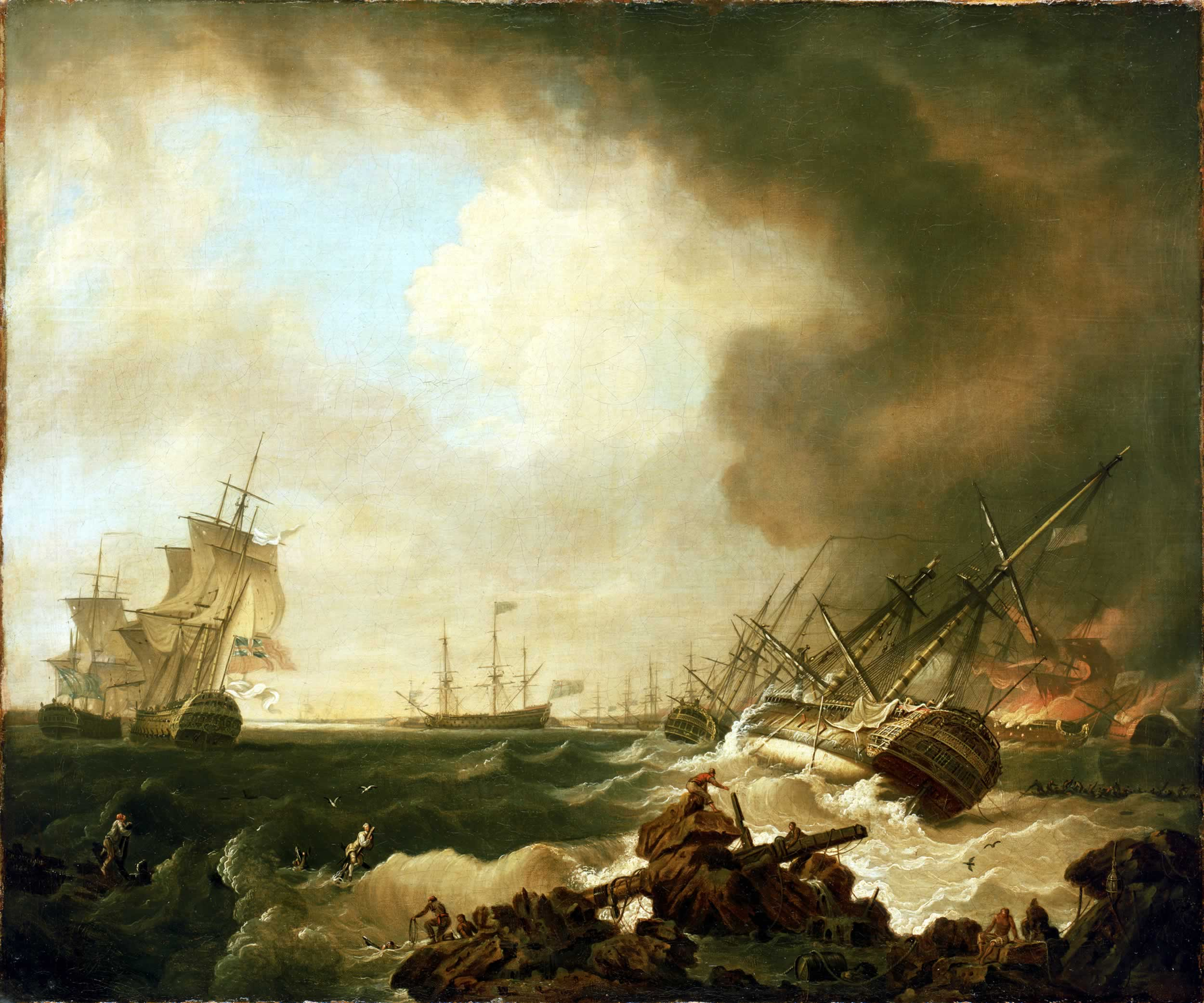
Painting of the battlefield on 21 November

The British continued to keep a tight blockade on the French coast, which continued to starve French ports of commerce, further weakening France's economy. Hawke attempted to destroy some of the French warships trapped in the Vilaine Estuary, sending in fire ships; but these failed to accomplish the task. Hawke developed a plan for landing on the coast, seizing a peninsula, and attacking the ships from land. However, he was forced to abandon this when orders reached him from Pitt for a different approach, which was ultimately unsuccessful.

The power of the French fleet was broken, and would not recover before the war was over. Combined with admiral Edward Boscawen's victory at the Battle of Lagos the previous August, the French invasion threat was removed. Although he had effectively put the French channel fleet out of action for the remainder of the war, Hawke was disappointed he had not secured a more comprehensive victory, asserting that had he had two more hours of daylight the whole enemy fleet would have been taken. Hawke's commission was extended and followed by a peerage in 1776.

The naval historian Nicholas Tracey described the battle as "the most dramatic sea battle in the age of sail", while the naval theorist and historian Alfred Mahan claimed that "The battle of 20 November 1759 was the Trafalgar of this war, and ... the English fleets were now free to act against the colonies of France, and later of Spain, on a grander scale than ever before." For instance, the French could not follow up their victory in the land battle of Sainte-Foy the following spring for want of reinforcements and supplies from France, and so Quiberon Bay may be regarded as the battle that determined the fate of New France and hence Canada. France experienced a credit crunch as financiers recognised that Britain could now strike at will against French trade. The French government was forced to default on its debt. The battle was one of a series of British victories in 1759 which caused the year to be known as an annus mirabilis (Latin for "year of wonders").

From this battle, and that two months earlier where, under General James Wolfe, the British captured Quebec, comes the Royal Naval toast "May our officers have the eye of a Hawke and the heart of a Wolfe".

== Orders of battle ==
=== France ===
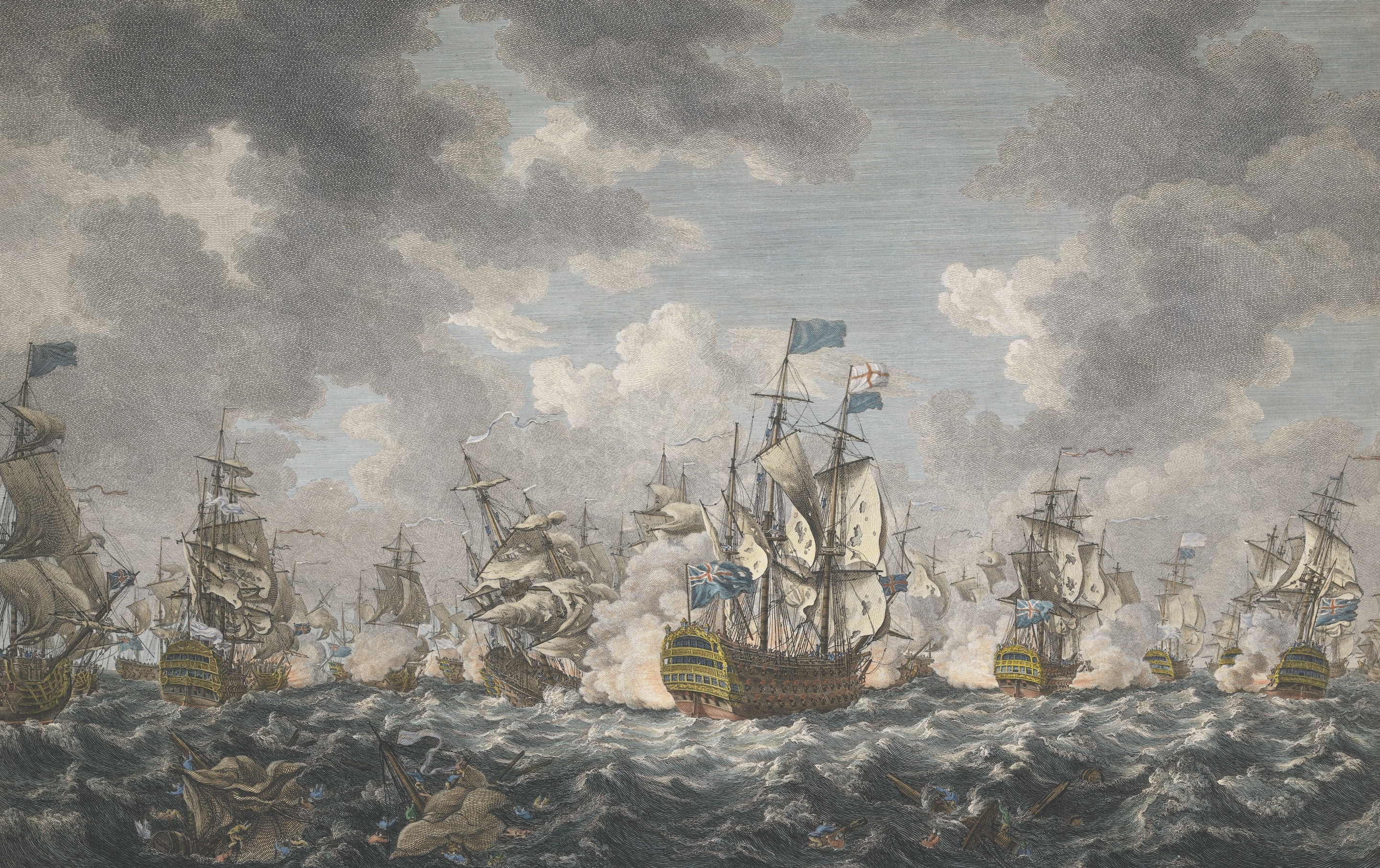
Battle of Quiberon Bay, 1761 Pierre-Charles Canot engraving after a Richard Paton painting

French order of battle
Name	Guns	Commander	Men	Notes
First Division
Soleil Royal	80	Paul Osée Bidé de Chézac	950	Flagship of de Brienne – Aground and burnt
Orient	80	Alain Nogérée de la Filière	750	Flagship of Chevalier de Guébridant Budes – Escaped to Rochefort
Glorieux	74	René Villars de la Brosse-Raquin	650	Escaped to the Vilaine, blockaded there until April, 1762
Robuste	74	Fragnier de Vienne	650	Escaped to the Vilaine, blockaded there until 1761, returned to Brest in January, 1762
Dauphin Royal	70	André d'Urtubie	630	Escaped to Rochefort
Dragon	64	Louis-Charles Le Vassor de La Touche	450	Escaped to the Vilaine, blockaded there until January, 1761
Solitaire	64	Louis-Vincent de Langle	450	Escaped to Rochefort
Second Division
Tonnant	80	Antoine de Marges de Saint-Victoret	800	Flagship of Chevalier de Beauffremont – Escaped to Rochefort
Intrépide	74	Charles Le Mercerel de Chasteloger	650	Escaped to Rochefort
Thésée	74	Guy François Coëtnempren de Kersaint	650	Foundered
Superbe	70	Jean-Pierre-René-Séraphin du Tertre de Montalais	630	Sunk by Royal George
Northumberland	64	Belingant de Kerbabut	450	Escaped to Rochefort
Éveillé	64	Pierre-Bernardin Thierry de La Prévalaye	450	Escaped to the Vilaine, blockaded there until 1761, returned to Brest in January, 1762
Brillant	64	Louis-Jean de Kerémar	450	Escaped to the Vilaine, blockaded there until January, 1761
Third Division
Formidable	80	Louis de Saint-André du Verger	800	Flagship of De Saint André du Vergé – Taken by Resolution
Magnifique	74	Sébastien Bigot de Morogues	650	Escaped to Rochefort
Héros	74	Vicomte de Sanzay	650	Surrendered, but ran aground next day during heavy weather, burnt
Juste	70	François de Saint-Allouarn	630	Wrecked in the Loire
Inflexible	64	Tancrede	540	Lost at the entrance to the Vilaine
Sphinx	64	Goyon	450	Escaped to the Vilaine, blockaded there until April, 1762
Bizarre	64	Prince de Montbazon	450	Escaped to Rochefort
Frigates and corvettes
Hébé	40		300	Returned to Brest
Aigrette	36			Escaped to the Vilaine
Vestale	34		254	Escaped to the Vilaine
Calypso	16	Paul Alexandre du Bois-Berthelot		Escaped to the Vilaine
Prince Noir	6	Pierre-Joseph Kergariou de Roscouet		Escaped to the Vilaine
Other
Vengeance	?			

=== Britain ===
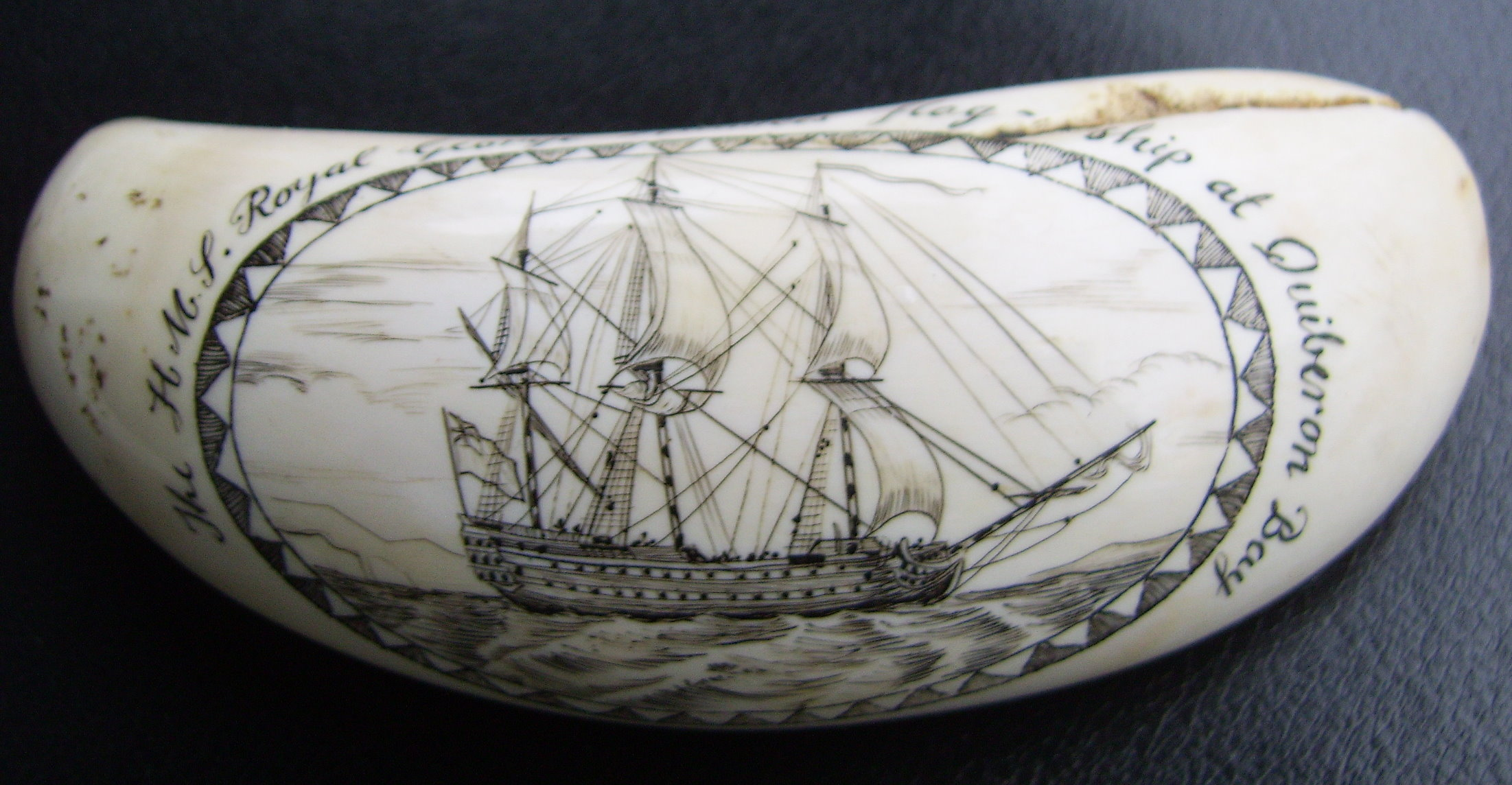
HMS Royal George, Hawke's flagship at Quiberon Bay – a replica of walrus ivory

British order of battle
Name	Guns	Commander	Men	Notes
Royal George	100	John Campbell	880	Flagship of Sir Edward Hawke
Union	90	Thomas Evans	770	Flagship of Sir Charles Hardy
Duke	80	Samuel Graves	800	
Namur	90	Matthew Buckle	780	
Mars	74	James Young	600	
Warspite	74	Sir John Bentley	600	
Hercules	74	William Fortescue	600	
Torbay	74	Augustus Keppel	600	
Magnanime	74	Viscount Howe	600	
Resolution	74	Henry Speke	600	Wrecked on Le Four shoal
Hero	74	George Edgcumbe	600	
Swiftsure	70	Sir Thomas Stanhope	520	
Dorsetshire	70	Peter Denis	520	
Burford	70	James Gambier	520	
Chichester	70	William Saltren Willet	520	
Temple	70	Washington Shirley	520	
Essex	64	Lucius O'Brien	480	Wrecked on Le Four shoal
Revenge	64	John Storr	480	
Montague	60	Joshua Rowley	400	
Kingston	60	Thomas Shirley	400	
Intrepid	60	Jervis Maplesden	400	
Dunkirk	60	Robert Digby	420	
Defiance	60	Patrick Baird	420	
Rochester	50	Robert Duff	350	
Portland	50	Mariot Arbuthnot	350	
Falkland	50	Francis Samuel Drake	350	
Chatham	50	John Lockhart	350	
Venus	36	Thomas Harrison	240	
Minerva	32	Alexander Hood	220	
Sapphire	32	John Strachan	220	
Vengeance	28	Gamaliel Nightingale	200	
Coventry	28	Francis Burslem	200	
Maidstone	28	Dudley Digges	200	

== Namesake ==
HMAS Quiberon was a destroyer named in memory of the battle of Quiberon Bay. She served in the Royal Navy and then the Royal Australian Navy. Quiberon was launched in 1942 and saw operations in World War II. She was decommissioned in 1964.

== Notes, citations and sources ==
=== Sources ===
- Anderson, Fred (2001). Crucible of War: The Seven Years' War and the Fate of Empire in British North America, 1754–1766. London: Faber and Faber. ISBN 978-0-571-20565-3.
- Cassells, Vic (2000). The Destroyers: their battles and their badges. East Roseville, New South Wales: Simon & Schuster. ISBN 978-0-7318-0893-9. OCLC 46829686.
- Chaline, Oliver (2011). "Quiberon Bay, 20 Novembre 1759". Les cahiers du Pays de Guérande (in French) (53). Société des Amis de Guérande: 17–29. ISSN 0765-3565.
- la Condamine, Pierre de (2000). Le combat des Cardinaux : 20 novembre 1759, baie de Quiberon et rade du Croisic (in French). La Turballe: L'Esprit large-Éd. Alizés. ISBN 978-2-911835-03-2.
- Corbett, Julian S. (1907), England in the Seven Years War vol II, Longmans Green
- Dull, Jonathan R. (2009). The Age of the Ship of the Line: the British and French Navies, 1650–1815. Barnsley, South Yorkshire: Pen & Sword Books. ISBN 978-1-84832-549-4.
- Jenkins, E.H. (1973). A History of the French Navy : From its Beginnings to the Present Day. London: Macdonald and Janeś. ISBN 978-0-356-04196-4.
- Mahan, Alfred Thayer Mahan (1890). "VIII". The Influence of Sea Power upon History, 1660–1783. London: Sampson, Low, Marston. OCLC 782063369.
- McLynn, Frank (2005). 1759: the Year Britain Became Master of the World. London: Pimlico. ISBN 978-0-09-952639-1.
- le Moing, Guy (2003). La Bataille Navale des Cardinaux: 20 novembre 1759 (in French). Paris: Economica. ISBN 978-2-7178-4503-7.
- Monod, Paul Kléber (2009). Imperial Island: A History of Britain and Its Empire, 1660–1837. Malden, Massachusetts: Wiley-Blackwell. ISBN 978-1-4051-3444-6.
- Rodger, N.A.M. (2004). The Command of the Ocean. London: Penguin. ISBN 978-0-7139-9411-7.
- Shrubb, R. E. A.; Sainsbury, A. B., eds. (1979). The Royal Navy Day by Day. Fontwell: Centaur Press. ISBN 978-0-900000-91-1.
- Szabo, Franz A. J. (2007). The Seven Years' War in Europe 1756–1763. Harlow, Essex: Longman. ISBN 978-0-582-29272-7.
- Tracey, Nicholas (2010). The Battle of Quiberon Bay, 1759: Hawke and the Defeat of the French Invasion. Barnsley, South Yorkshire: Pen & Sword. ISBN 978-1-84884-116-1.
- Troude, Onesime-Joachim (1867). Batailles Navales de la France, Volume 1 (in French). Paris: Libraire Commissionaire de la Marine. OCLC 757299734.
- Willis, Sam (2009). "The Battle of Lagos, 1759". The Journal of Military History. 73 (3): 745–765. doi:10.1353/jmh.0.0366. ISSN 0899-3718. S2CID 162390731.
- Bodart, Gaston (1908). Militär-historisches Kriegs-Lexikon (1618-1905).
