= HMS Resolution (1758) =

Ship of the line of the Royal Navy

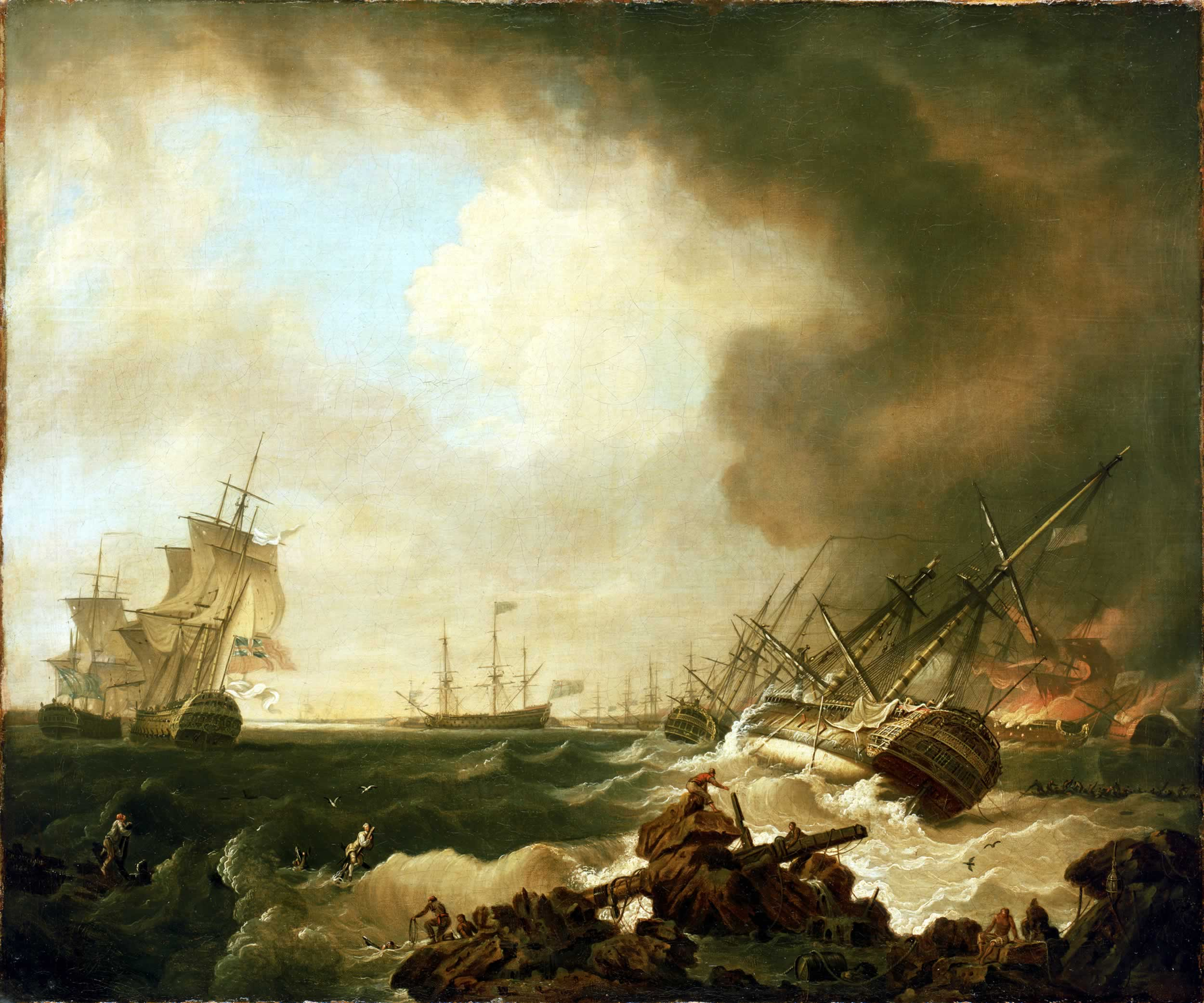
- Battle of Quiberon Bay: the Day After (Richard Wright, 1760) Resolution is on her starboard side in the foreground

History

Great Britain
- Name: HMS Resolution
- Ordered: 24 November 1755
- Builder: Henry Bird, Northam, Southampton
- Laid down: December 1755
- Launched: 14 December 1758
- Commissioned: 23 March 1759
- Fate: Wrecked, 20 November 1759 during Battle of Quiberon
- Notes: Participated in: Battle of Quiberon Bay

General characteristics
- Class & type: Dublin-class ship of the line
- Tons burthen: 15695/94 (bm)
- Length: 165 ft 6 in (50.44 m) (gundeck)
- Beam: 46 ft 6 in (14.17 m)
- Depth of hold: 19 ft 9 in (6.02 m)
- Propulsion: Sails
- Sail plan: Full-rigged ship
- Armament: 74 guns: Gundeck: 28 × 32 pdrs; Upper gundeck: 28 × 18 pdrs; Quarterdeck: 14 × 9 pdrs; Forecastle: 4 × 9 pdrs

HMS Resolution was a 74-gun third-rate ship of the line of the Royal Navy, launched on 14 December 1758 at Northam, near Southampton.

== Design and construction ==
On 24 November 1755 the Navy Board were instructed to build a new 70-gun ship by contract "in the neighbourhood of Portsmouth, by the same draught as those lately ordered" (the Dublin class). Soon after, the Dublin class ships were officially increased from 70 guns to 74 guns, reflecting the actual number of guns they were to carry. On 3 December, a contract was agreed with shipbuilders Henry Bird & Co to build this ship at a contract price of £16 per ton (totaling £24,750.16.0d for 1,54687/94 tons (bm). Work began later that month, the ship was launched at Northam on 14 December 1858 and taken to Portsmouth Dockyard, where she was completed and fitted out on 23 March 1759 at an additional cost of £8,505.15.1d.

== Service and loss ==
The ship was commissioned on 9 February 1759 under Captain Francis Geary. On 21 May, Geary was made a Commodore and then, two weeks later on 4 June, he was promoted to Rear-Admiral, and Captain Richard Norbury was placed in command of the ship under him on 5th June. On 7 July 1759 both Geary and Norbury left the ship, which was now given to the command of Captain Henry Speke.

On 20 November the same year, the Resolution took part in the decisive Battle of Quiberon Bay, still under the command of Speke. Just before 4pm she took the surrender of the French ship Formidable. With a full westerly gale blowing throughout the battle, the Resolution (which had suffered damage to her rigging in the contest, attempted to tack in very restricted waters in order to leave the bay, but missed stays and ran onto the Fours sandbank, the position of which she was unsure. Early the next morning she floated off at high water but could not get free of the sandbanks and grounded again at the ebb tide. The timbers had been badly strained, and the ship filled, settled and sank.

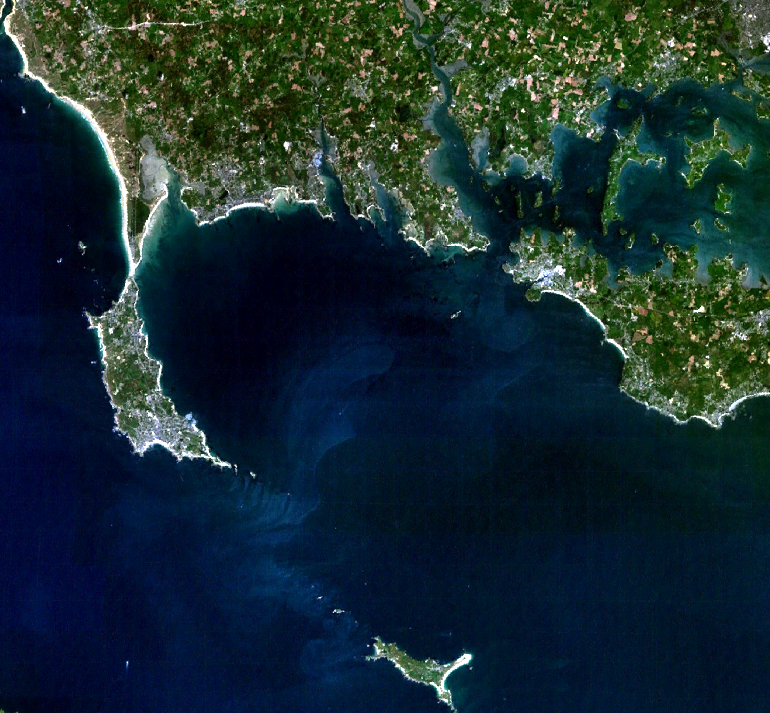
Satellite image of the shoals of Quiberon Bay
