= French ship Formidable (1751) =

Ship of the line of the French Navy

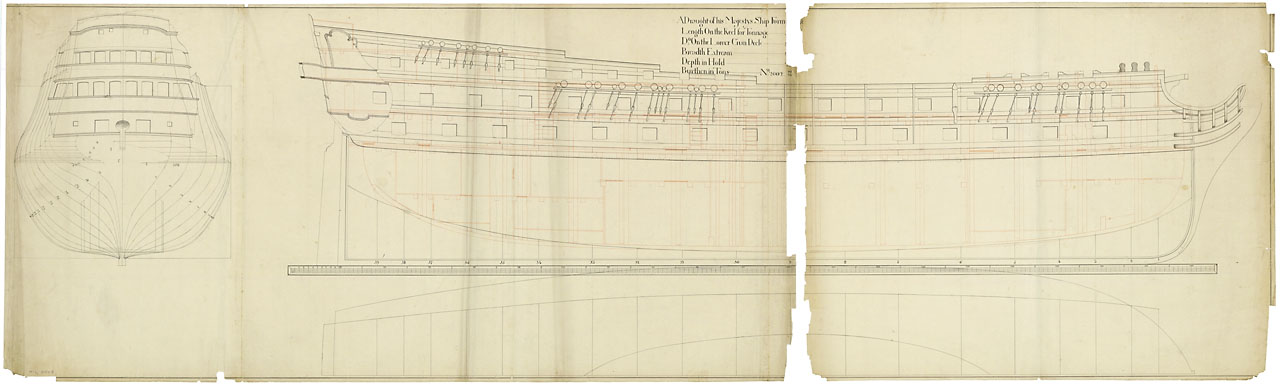
- Plan of HMS Formidable (1759)

History

France
- Name: Formidable
- Launched: June 1751
- Captured: 20 November 1759, by Royal Navy
- Notes: Participated in: Battle of Quiberon Bay

Great Britain
- Name: Formidable
- Acquired: 20 November 1759
- Fate: Broken up, 1768

General characteristics
- Class & type: 80-gun third rate ship of the line
- Tons burthen: 2002 tons
- Length: 188 ft (57 m) (gundeck)
- Beam: 49 ft 2.75 in (15.0051 m)
- Depth of hold: 21 ft 4.5 in (6.515 m)
- Propulsion: Sails
- Sail plan: Full-rigged ship
- Armament: 80 guns of various weights of shot

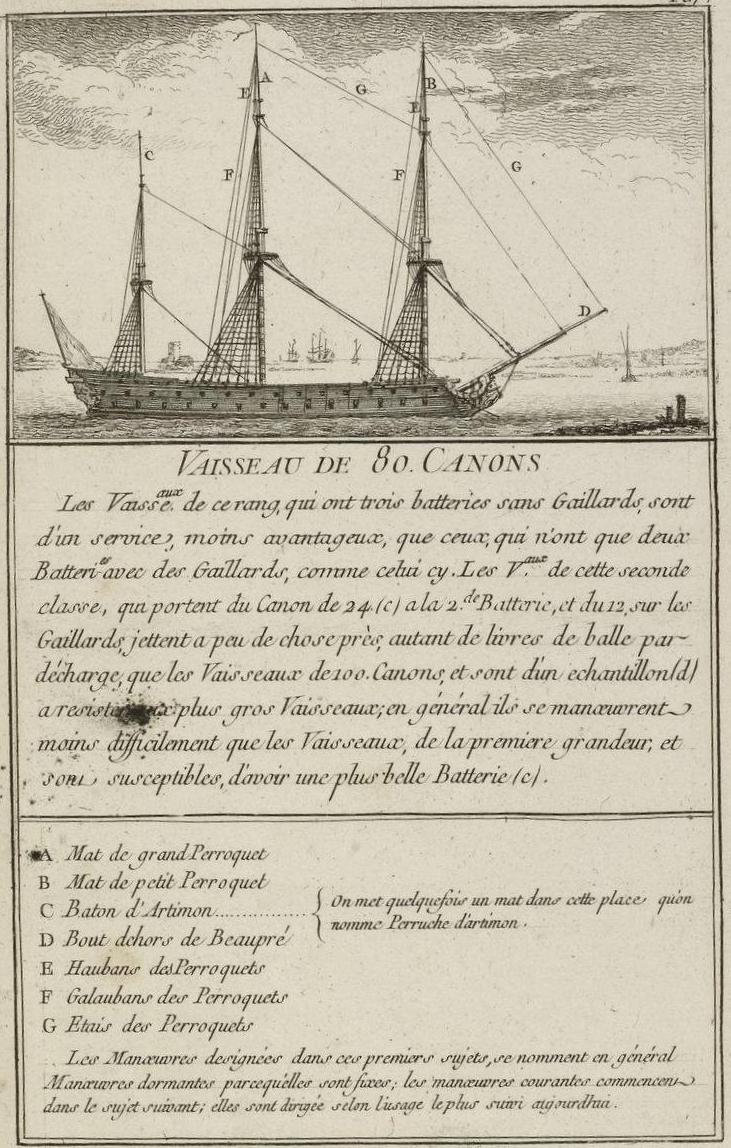
an image of French ship Formidable (1751)

Formidable was an 80-gun ship of the line of the French Navy, launched in 1751.

== Career ==
In 1754, Formidable was under Duchaffault, part of a squadron under Mac Nemara.

She fought at the Battle of Quiberon Bay on 20 November 1759, where she served as the flagship of Saint André du Vergé. HMS Resolution captured her at the battle and the Admiralty commissioned her in the Royal Navy as the Third Rate HMS Formidable.

== Fate ==
Formidable was broken up in 1768.

== In popular culture ==
The Formidable appears as a legendary ship fought in the 2014 video game Assassin's Creed: Rogue at the Battle of Quiberon Bay. In contrast to the game, the ship was sunk by the protagonist Shay Cormac with his ship, the Morrigan, instead of being captured by the Royal Navy. Like all men-of-war in the game, the ship is a 116-gun first rate ship of the line, contrary to its real world counterpart.
