= John Elliot (Royal Navy officer) =

Royal Navy officer and colonial administrator (1732–1808)

Admiral John Elliot
- Born: 1732; Scotland
- Died: 20 September 1808 (aged 75–76); Monteviot House, Roxburghshire
- Relatives: Sir Gilbert Elliot (father); Sir Gilbert Elliot (brother); Jean Elliot (sister)
- Military career
- Allegiance: Great Britain; United Kingdom
- Branch: Royal Navy
- Service years: 1740–1808
- Rank: Admiral
- Commands: HMS Hussar; HMS Aeolus; HMS Gosport; HMS Chichester; HMS Firme; HMS Portland; HMS Trident; HMS Edgar; Downs Station
- Conflicts: Seven Years' War; Battle of Bishops Court; American Revolutionary War; Battle of Rhode Island; Great Siege of Gibraltar; Battle of Cape St. Vincent; Battle of Ushant; French Revolutionary Wars; Napoleonic Wars

Viceregal styles of John Elliot
- Reference style: His Excellency
- Spoken style: Your Excellency

Admiral John Elliot (1732 – 20 September 1808) was a Royal Navy officer and colonial administrator who served in the Seven Years' War and American War of Independence. He rose to the rank of admiral, and served briefly as the governor of Newfoundland.

Elliot was born into a Scottish gentry family and joined the British navy in 1740. Little is known about his early service, but he received a promotion to post-captain during the Seven Years' War, and commanded the 32-gun frigate HMS Aeolus with distinction, first capturing a small French frigate, and then taking command of a squadron of three ships and bringing to action the notorious privateer François Thurot, who had been raiding the coast of Ireland in 1760. After a short but bitter engagement, Thurot was killed and his ships captured. Elliot was widely hailed as a hero and he and his captains received several rewards. He commanded several other ships during the remainder of the war, and after a period of unemployment during the peace, returned to active service during the American War of Independence.

His service in this conflict involved carrying the members of the Carlisle Peace Commission to America, and playing a minor role in operations off the coast, before returning to European waters. He was present at the relief of Gibraltar and the Battle of Cape St Vincent with Admiral Sir George Rodney, and saw action at the Battle of Ushant with Admiral Richard Kempenfelt. Promoted to flag rank after the end of the war he served as governor of Newfoundland during the peace, but was unable to take any commands during the French Revolutionary Wars owing to his infirmity, and died in 1808 with the rank of admiral.

== Family and early life ==
Elliot was born in Scotland in 1732, the fourth son of Sir Gilbert Elliot, 2nd Baronet, of Minto and his wife Helen. Little is known about his early life but he joined the Royal Navy after graduating from the Royal Naval Academy, Portsmouth in 1740, and went aboard HMS Augusta in July that year. From there he went to the hospital ship HMS Princess Royal, and after a period probably spent in the merchant service, Elliot served aboard HMS Chesterfield and HMS Assistance, and for two years aboard the sloop HMS Peggy. He passed his lieutenant's examination on 1 May 1752, though he did not receive a commission until 30 April 1756, when he joined HMS Scarborough. It was about this time that his brother, Gilbert Elliot, who had entered parliament, became one of the Lords of the Admiralty, and so was able to speed his brother's rise through the ranks. John Elliot was promoted to commander on 21 January 1757 and then advanced to post-captain on 5 April 1757. His first appointment was to command HMS Hussar with the Channel Fleet, and he took part in the reconnaissance of Rochefort in early 1758.

In November 1758 he was appointed to the newly launched 32-gun HMS Aeolus. On 19 March 1759, while sailing off Brittany in company with the 50-gun HMS Isis came across a squadron of four French corvettes escorting a convoy. While the convoy and two frigates fled, pursued by Isis, the remaining two French ships, the 36-gun Blonde and the 20-gun Mignonne came up to prevent Aeolus from following. Elliot fought an action with the Mignonne, capturing her after a hard-fought engagement, though Blonde escaped. The battle cost Mignone the lives of her commander, and many of her crew, with the second captain and 25 men being wounded. Aeolus's casualties amounted to two or three men wounded. Elliot spent the rest of the year cruising off the French coast with Sir Edward Hawke's fleet, and on 27 December sailed on a cruise from Quiberon Bay with the 64-gun HMS Intrepid. The ships were caught in bad weather, and on being unable to reach the appointed rendezvous point of Groix, and with provisions running low, Elliot made instead for Kinsale to resupply, putting in there on 21 January 1760. He remained trapped there by the weather, and while waiting for the opportunity to sail again a letter reached him from the Lord Lieutenant of Ireland, the Duke of Bedford, asking for assistance. The French privateer François Thurot had landed near Carrickfergus with several ships and had occupied the town. The letter had been sent to all the ports in the hopes of there being ships available to intercept the French, but no ships were stationed on the coast, and only by chance was Elliot at Kinsale. Also there sheltering from the weather were the 36-gun ships HMS Brilliant and HMS Pallas.

== Defeating Thurot ==
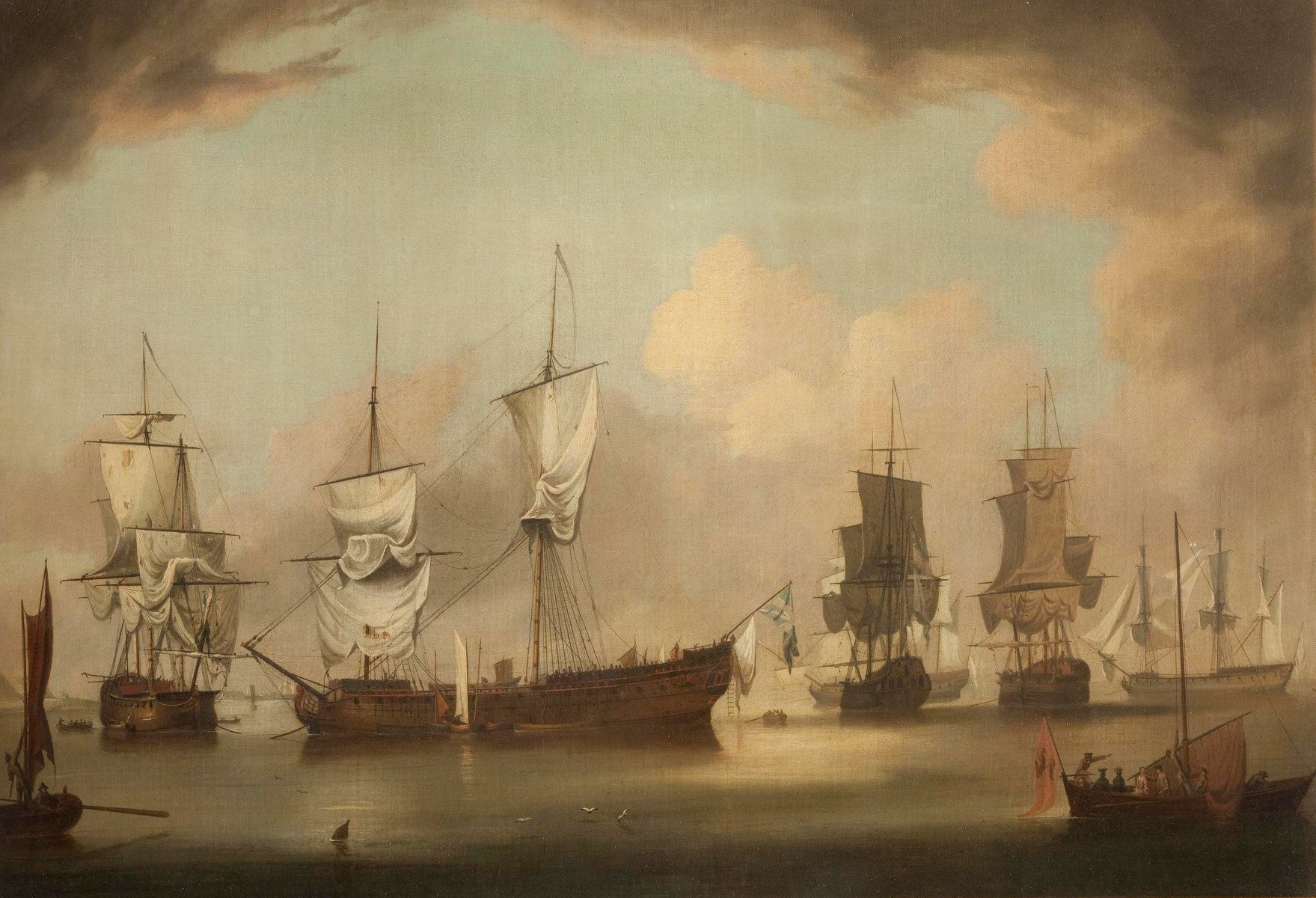
Elliot and Thurot's ships in Ramsey Bay after the Battle of Bishops Court

Elliot rushed his ships to sea and arrived off Carrickfergus on 26 February, but learnt that the French had already sailed. Elliot's force set off in pursuit, and caught up with them on 28 February. The French force, consisting of the ships Maréchal de Belle-Isle, Terpsichore and Blonde, were brought to battle off the Isle of Man at 9 in the morning. After a close-fought action, Thurot's force was battered into submission, with his ships dismasted and reduced to a sinking condition. Thurot was hit by a musket ball and died during the action, with his body being thrown overboard.

The French suffered 300 killed or wounded, while British losses amounted to four killed and 15 wounded on Aeolus, one killed and five wounded on Pallas and 11 wounded on Brilliant. Thurot's body was washed ashore at Port William and was buried with full military honours at Kirkmaiden. Among the possessions found on him was a tobacco box of chased silver and engraved with his name, which was presented to Elliot by Sir William Maxwell, who arranged Thurot's funeral and acted as chief mourner.

Elliot and his captains received the thanks of both the British and Irish Parliaments, and the freedom of the city of Cork. Elliot's cousin, Thomas Pasley was serving on Aeolus during the battle, and having distinguished himself in the fighting, was promoted to lieutenant of the ship. Both Blonde and Terpsichore were taken into the Royal Navy, while on Elliot's return to Spithead, he was presented to King George II. Songs were written about the battle and images and depictions of it were widely distributed. Years later, in 1804, Vice-Admiral Horatio Nelson wrote a letter to John Elliot's nephew, then Lord Minto:

I beg you will present my respects to Admiral Elliot; I have had the honour of being introduced to him twenty-two years ago, but never had the pleasure of serving with him; but his action with Thurot will stand the test with any of our modern Victories.

— Victory, at sea, 11 January 1804

== Last years of war ==
Elliot further distinguished himself by cutting out a French brig laden with naval stores from under the guns of a French shore battery at Belle Île on 17 May 1760. Aeolus was badly damaged during the action, and returned to port to be repaired. While these were being carried out it is possible that Elliot was temporarily appointed to command the 44-gun HMS Gosport, aboard which he escorted an outward bound merchant convoy headed to the Baltic. However, Elliot's records are often confused (or have been intermingled) with those of Captain John Eliot (1742–1769), who may have commanded Gosport instead. With this service completed, and repairs on Aeolus being finished, Elliot resumed command of her, and spent 1761 cruising in the Bay of Biscay. He captured a 4-gun French privateer named Carnival on 23 March, and brought her into Spithead. On his arrival there he was appointed to command the 70-gun HMS Chichester. He spent the rest of the war in command of Chichester, going out to the Mediterranean in the later stages with Sir Charles Saunders's fleet, but they did not see any action.

== American War of Independence ==
Left without a ship after the peace in 1763, Elliot did not return to active service until 1767, when he was given command of the 60-gun HMS Firme, one of the Plymouth guardships. He also briefly became Member of Parliament for Cockermouth that year. He was moved to the newly built HMS Portland on 26 September 1770, but left her the following year and received no further commissions until 1777, when he took command of the 64-gun HMS Trident during the American War of Independence. He had been elected a Fellow of the Royal Society in January 1776, during his time ashore. He was promoted to commodore on 11 April 1778, and shortly afterwards took the Earl of Carlisle, George Johnstone and William Eden to North America to negotiate with the colonists as the Carlisle Peace Commission. After arriving at Delaware Elliot joined Richard Howe's command and took part in the relief of Rhode Island. He left the Trident towards the end of 1778 and returned to England and a brief spell of unemployment until his appointment to command the 74-gun HMS Edgar in May 1779. It was about this time that he was made a Colonel of Marines, a post he held until 1787.

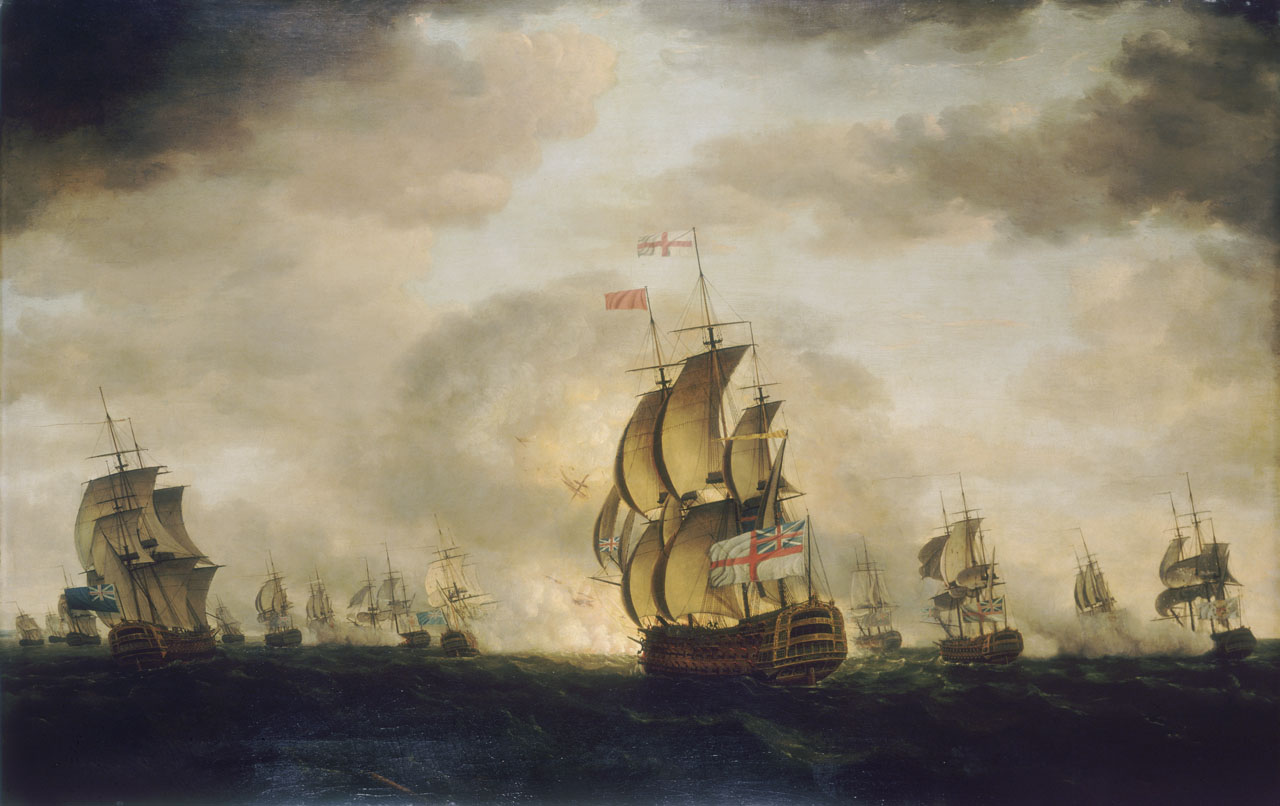
The Battle of Cape St. Vincent, in which Elliot played a significant part

Elliot went out with Admiral Sir George Rodney's fleet to relieve Gibraltar in 1780 and took part in the defeat of the Spanish fleet under Juan de Lángara at the Battle of Cape St. Vincent on 16 January 1780. Edgar played a large part in the fighting, suffering casualties of six killed and 20 wounded, the third highest casualty figures of the British ships.^{[a]} Having temporarily relieved Gibraltar, Rodney took his fleet to the West Indies, but left Elliot and Edgar at Gibraltar to support the garrison there. Captain Erasmus Gower was appointed as his flag captain. Elliot soon found that there was little assistance that he could render, and having a ship as large as Edgar on station there made her a target for Spanish gunboats. Rodney was rebuked for leaving him there, as it was against his orders, and necessitated sending a frigate to order his return. Elliot consequently returned to England.

Elliot spent most of the remaining years of the war commanding Edgar in the English Channel. In November 1781, the Admiralty had received intelligence that a large convoy was preparing to sail from Brest under Admiral de Guichen. It was a convoy of transports carrying naval supplies for the West Indies and the French fleet in the East Indies. Edgar was part of Admiral Richard Kempenfelt's squadron of 18 ships, commanded from HMS Victory, which was ordered to intercept the convoy. Kempenfelt did so in the afternoon of 12 December in the Bay of Biscay, approximately 150 miles (241.4 km) south-west of Ushant. With the French naval escort to leeward of the convoy, Kempenfelt attacked immediately, capturing 15 of the transports before nightfall. The rest of the convoy scattered, most returning to [Brest; only five transports reached the West Indies. During the engagement, known as the Battle of Ushant, Edgar fought a running battle with the 84-gun Triomphant. Elliot was later praised by Kempenfelt for his actions during the battle. Elliot was moved into HMS Romney in June 1782, and there were plans to send him to the West Indies in command of a squadron of five ships of the line and a frigate, but the end of the war prevented this.

== Later years ==
Again left unemployed by the peace, Elliot remained without a command until 1786, when he was appointed Governor and commander-in-chief of Newfoundland. Once again he appointed Captain Erasmus Gower as his flag captain. He fulfilled the post for its usual term, sailing out in June each year and returning in October, with his principal duties being the regulation of the fisheries. He was succeeded by a new commander, Vice-Admiral Mark Milbanke in 1789, having been promoted to rear-admiral of the red on 24 September 1787. He was further advanced to vice-admiral of the blue on 21 February 1790, and as tensions rose with the Spanish Armament that year, Elliot hoisted his flag aboard HMS Barfleur, but with the easing of the crisis soon struck it. Increasingly infirm, he was promoted to vice-admiral of the red on 12 April 1794, after the outbreak of the French Revolutionary Wars, but was unable to take up any posts. He was promoted to admiral of the blue on 16 April 1795, and then to admiral of the white. He settled at his estate at Mount Teviot, Roxburghshire during his last years and died there on 20 September 1808. He never married. His nephews included Thomas Pasley, William Cathcart, 1st Earl Cathcart and Admiral Robert Digby. Another nephew was Gilbert Elliot-Murray-Kynynmound, 1st Earl of Minto, who inherited John Elliot's estates.

== Notes ==
a. The two ships with higher casualties were HMS Defence, with 10 killed and 21 wounded, and HMS Monarch, with three killed and 26 wounded.

== Citations ==
Parliament of Great Britain
Preceded by Sir John Mordaunt; Charles Jenkinson	Member of Parliament for Cockermouth; 1767–1768; With: Sir John Mordaunt	Succeeded by Charles Jenkinson; Sir George Macartney
Military offices
New post	Commander-in-Chief, The Downs; 1777–1778	Succeeded by Matthew Buckle
Political offices
Preceded by John Campbell	Commodore Governor of Newfoundland; 1786–1789	Succeeded by Mark Milbanke
