= Michael Clements =

Royal Navy officer (died 1796)

Rear-Admiral Michael Clements
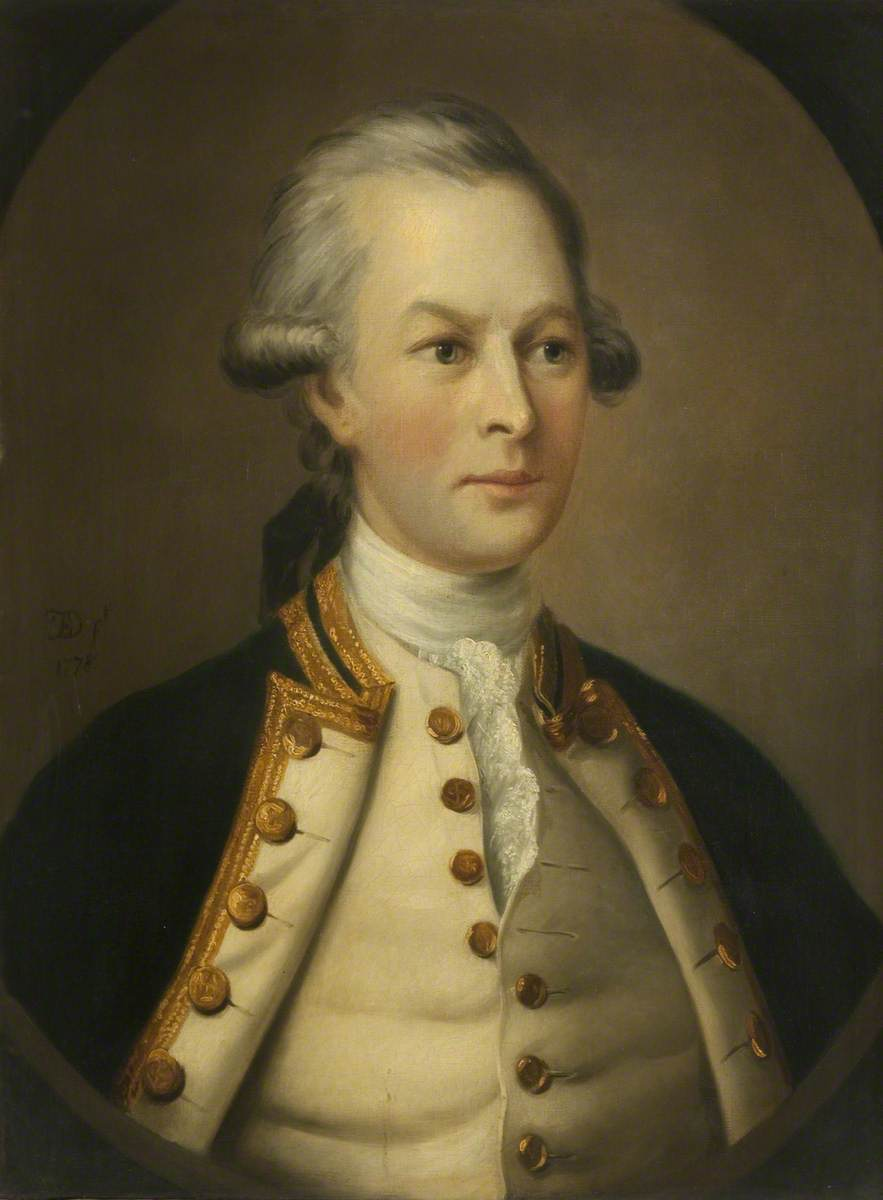
- Clements in 1778, by Thomas Anthony Devis
- Born: 1735
- Died: 1796 (aged 60–61)
- Military career
- Allegiance: Kingdom of Great Britain
- Branch: Royal Navy
- Service years: c.1748–1789
- Rank: Rear-Admiral
- Commands: HMS London; HMS Actaeon; HMS Pallas; HMS Dorsetshire; HMS Vengeance
- Conflicts: War of the Austrian Succession Seven Years' War: Battle of Bishops Court; American Revolutionary War: Battle of Ushant

Michael Clements (1735–1796) was a rear-admiral in the Royal Navy.

== Early life ==
Clements was born in 1735, the son of a rector in Leicestershire. He enlisted in the Royal Navy at the age of thirteen, serving as a captain's servant and then midshipman. On 17 November 1755 he passed the Admiralty Board examination for the rank of lieutenant, and was commissioned two weeks later as first lieutenant aboard HMS Unicorn. He was still serving in this position in 1757, at the outbreak of the Seven Years' War between France and England. In May 1757, Unicorn encountered and engaged L'Invincible, a French privateer from St Malo. The captain of Unicorn was killed, but Clements assumed command and secured the capture of the privateer. The French vessel was brought into Kinsale; and Clements immediately took Unicorn back to sea in pursuit of a second French vessel, which was also captured and brought in. For this service Clements was recommended for promotion; he spent four months as commander of HMS London, a 6-gun busse and was then named as post-captain of the 28-gun frigate HMS Actaeon from 29 September 1757.

== Royal Navy Captain ==
Clements continued in Actaeon, attached to the Channel fleet, till the summer of 1759, when he was moved into Pallas of 36 guns, also with the fleet blockading Brest and Quiberon Bay. He was specially employed, with other frigates, in cruising against French privateers and in communicating with the home ports. By chance, Pallas, in company with Brilliant and Aeolus, put into Kinsale in the last days of February 1760, just as a message came from the Duke of Bedford, then lord-lieutenant of Ireland, that François Thurot's squadron was at Belfast. They immediately put to sea and, coming to Belfast on the morning of the 28th, succeeded in capturing Thurot's ships with small loss. The casualties among Clements' crew amounted to one killed and five wounded. For his part in the battle Clements received a formal vote of thanks from the Irish House of Commons.

Pallas continued on the same service till towards the end of the year, and was then sent to the Mediterranean, where she remained till after the peace, and returned to England to be decommissioned in December 1763. On paying off this ship Clements refused to give a certificate of service to the ship's master, whom he reported as 'inattentive to his duty.' The master made a counter-accusation that Clements had misused and wasted the ship's stores, but in November 1765 a Navy Board inquiry dismissed this allegation as both groundless and inspired by malice. In December 1765, Clements married a London woman, Miss Hopton, who brought with her a substantial personal fortune of £10,000.

In 1769 Clements commanded HMS Dorsetshire of 70 guns, guardship at Portsmouth, but which in 1770 was sent up the Mediterranean as part of the answer to a threatening armament of the French at Toulon. In March 1778 he was appointed to HMS Vengeance of 74 guns, which he commanded in the action off Ushant on 27 July and in the October cruise under Admiral Augustus Keppel. He was afterwards a witness for the defence in the admiral's trial, and spoke strongly in the admiral's favour, which was not to his personal advantage.

== Later life ==
A few months later Clements was compelled by failing mental health to resign his command. In July he was granted leave from the Navy to go abroad with his family, and travelled to Ostend with his wife and daughter. His name continued on the list of captains till around 1789, when by virtue of seniority he was promoted to rear admiral on the superannuated list. His wife died in around 1786, after which Clements' mental health declined further and he was confined to an insane asylum. He died in around 1796.

== Bibliography ==
- Chambers, John (1820). Biographical Illustrations of Worcestershire: Including Lives of Persons, Natives or Residents Eminent either for Piety or Talent. London: R. & S. Prowett. OCLC 719415216.
- Clowes, William Laird (1898). The Royal Navy: A History From the Earliest Times to the Present. Vol. 3. London: Sampson, Low, Marston and Company. OCLC 645627800.
- Duffy, Michael; McLeod, Anne Byrne (2011). The Mid-Eighteenth Century Navy from the Perspective of Captain Thomas Burnett and his Peers (PhD). Exeter, United Kingdom: University of Exeter. OCLC 757128667.
