= Venus-class frigate =

1758 class of British fifth-rate frigates

Class overview
- Built: 1756–1758
- In commission: 1758–1809
- Completed: 3

General characteristics
- Tons burthen: 718 18/94 bm (as designed)
- Length: 128 ft 4 in (39 m) (gundeck); 106 ft 2.625 in (32.37548 m) (keel)
- Beam: 35 ft 8 in (11 m)
- Depth of hold: 12 ft 4 in (4 m)
- Sail plan: Full-rigged ship
- Complement: 240
- Armament: 36 guns comprising: Upper deck: 26 × 12-pounder guns; Quarterdeck: 8 × 6-pounder guns; Forecastle: 2 × 6-pounder guns

The Venus-class frigates were three 36-gun sailing frigates of the fifth rate produced for the Royal Navy. They were designed in 1756 by Sir Thomas Slade, and were enlarged from his design for the 32-gun Southampton-class frigates, which had been approved four months earlier.

The 36-gun frigates, of which this was to be the only British design in the era of the 12-pounder frigate, carried the same battery of twenty-six 12-pounders as their 32-gun predecessors; the only difference lay in the secondary armament on the quarterdeck which was here doubled to eight 6-pounders. Slade's 36-gun design was approved on 13 July 1756, on which date two ships were approved to be built by contract to these plans. A third ship was ordered about two weeks later, to be built in a royal dockyard.

The Venus-class were faster than the Southampton-class, making up to 13 knots ahead of strong winds and ten knots while close-hauled compared with Southampton-class speeds of 12 and 8 knots respectively. Both Venus- and Southampton-class frigates were highly maneuverable and more capable of withstanding heavy weather than their French equivalents during the Seven Years' War.

== Ships in class ==
Ship	Ordered	Builder	Laid down	Launched	Completed	Fate	Ref.
HMS Pallas	13 July 1756	William Wells & Company, Deptford Dockyard	July 1756	30 August 1757	8 October 1757 at Deptford	Run ashore due to leaks and burnt on Sao Jorge (Azores) on 12 February 1783	
HMS Venus	13 July 1756	John Okill, Liverpool.	16 August 1756	11 March 1758	30 June 1758 at Liverpool	Reduced to 32 guns in 1792. Renamed Heroine on 14 July 1807. Paid off 1809 and laid up. Sold to break up at Deptford Dockyard on 22 September 1828	
HMS Brilliant	29 July 1756	Thomas Bucknall, Plymouth Dockyard	28 August 1756	27 October 1757	20 November 1757	Sold at Deptford Dockyard, 1 November 1776	
