= HMS Pallas (1757) =

British fifth-rate frigate (1757–1783)

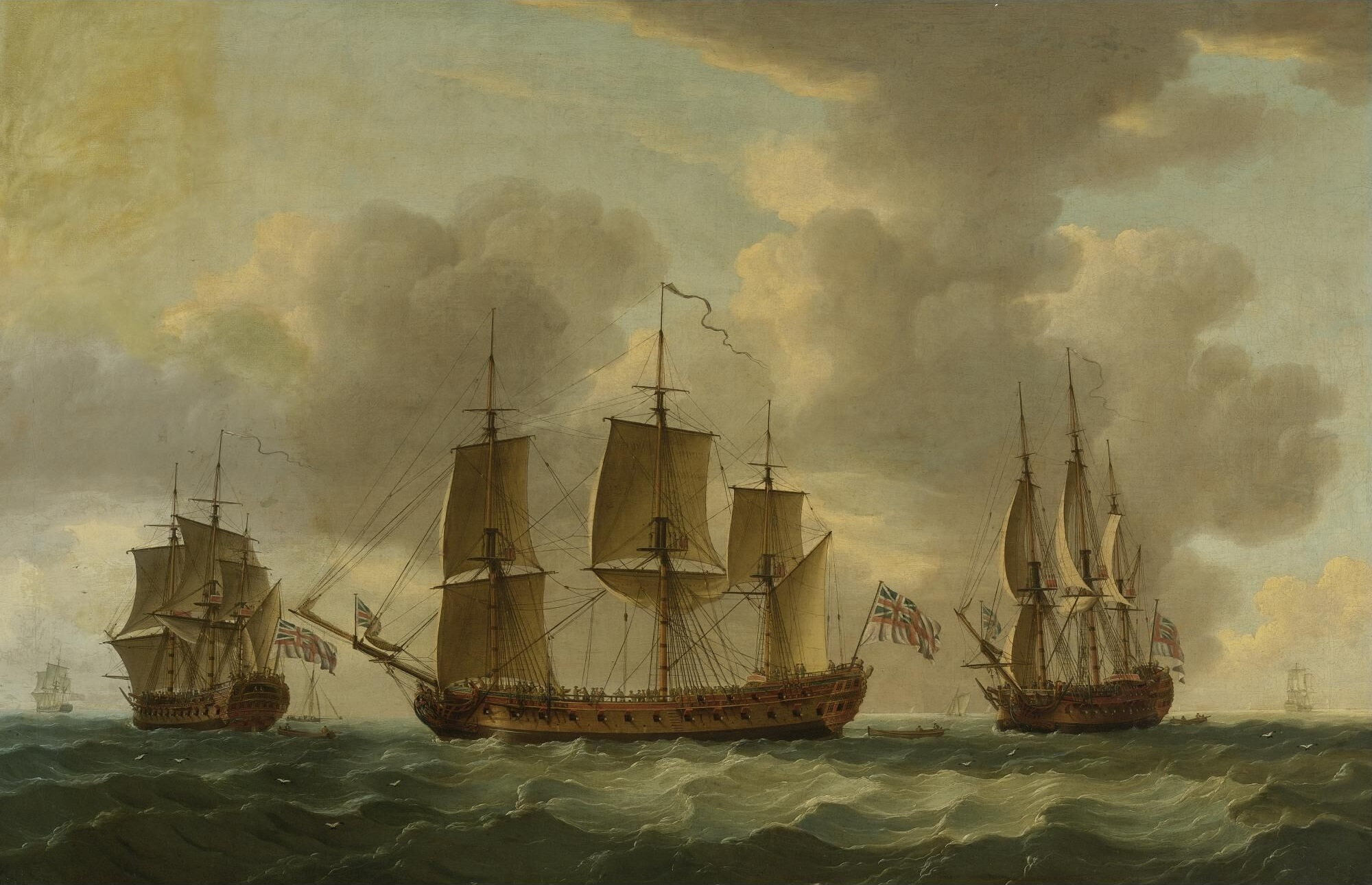
- Pallas in three positions, by John Cleveley the Elder, 1769

History

Great Britain
- Name: HMS Pallas
- Ordered: 13 July 1756
- Builder: William Wells, Deptford
- Laid down: July 1756
- Launched: 30 August 1757
- Completed: 8 October 1757 at Deptford Dockyard
- Commissioned: August 1757
- Fate: Burnt to avoid capture, 24 February 1783

General characteristics
- Class & type: Venus-class fifth-rate frigate
- Tons burthen: 728 73/94 bm
- Length: 128 ft 4 in (39.12 m) (gundeck); 106 ft 4 in (32.41 m) (keel)
- Beam: 35 ft 10.75 in (10.9411 m)
- Depth of hold: 12 ft 4.5 in (3.772 m)
- Sail plan: Full-rigged ship
- Complement: 240 officers and men
- Armament: 36 guns comprising: Upperdeck: 26 × 12-pounder guns; Quarterdeck: 8 × 6-pounder guns; Forecastle: 2 × 6-pounder guns

HMS Pallas was one of the three 36-gun Venus-class fifth-rate frigates of the Royal Navy. She was launched in 1757 and initially served in Sir Edward Hawke's fleet blockading the coast of France where she fought at the Raid on Cherbourg and in the Battle of Bishops Court. She later served for a number of years in the Mediterranean Sea before moving to serve off the coast of Africa between 1774 and 1776 where she protected the isolated British colonies. In 1778 she joined the Newfoundland Station and participated in the attack on Saint Pierre and Miquelon. Pallas returned to the English Channel after this and assisted in destroying a French invasion force intended for the Channel Islands in 1779 before briefly serving on the Jamaica Station. In 1783 she was beached on São Jorge Island after she was found to be heavily leaking; she was burned there on 24 February.

== Construction ==
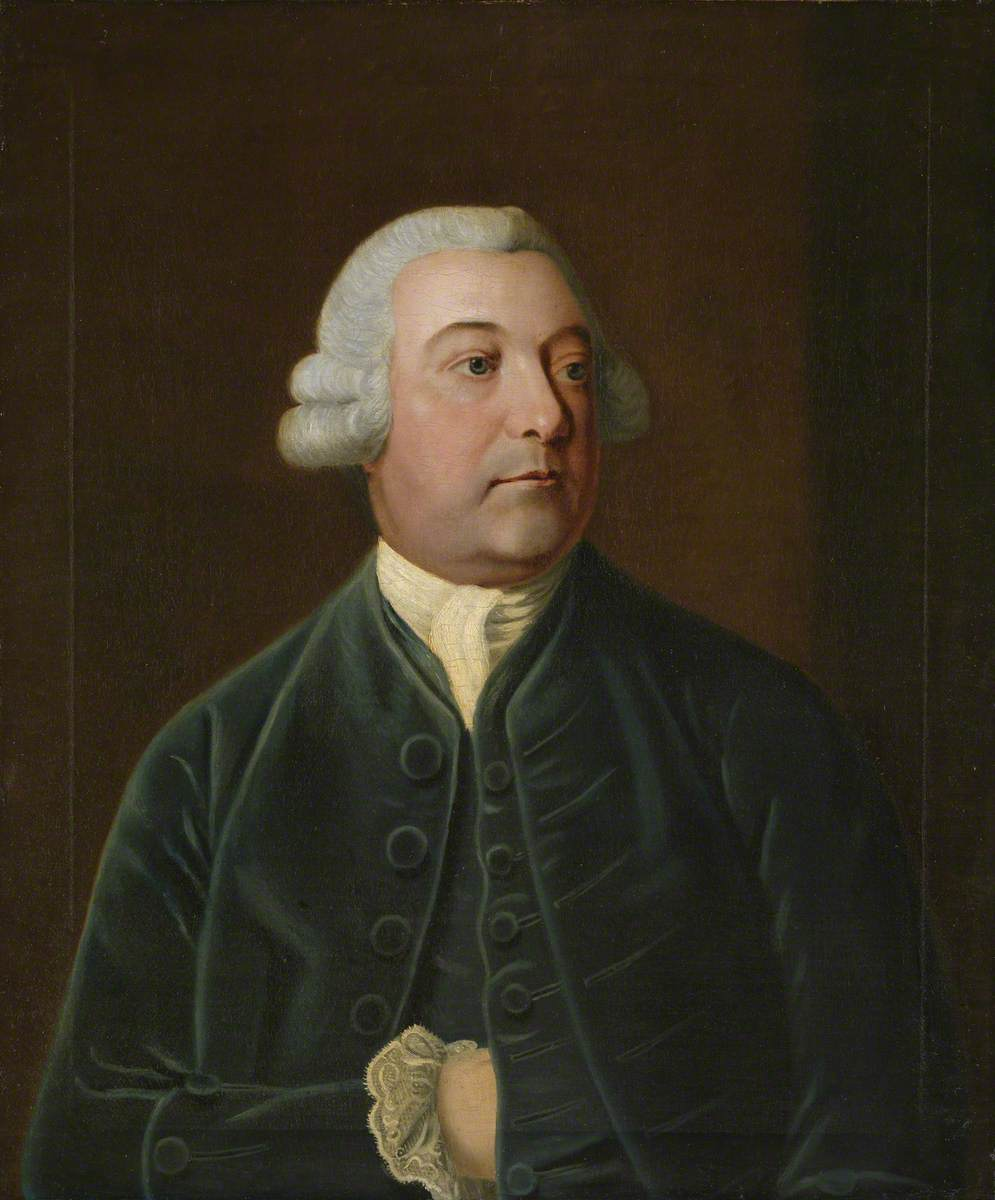
Sir Thomas Slade, naval architect for Pallas in 1756

The Venus class of 36-gun frigates were designed by Sir Thomas Slade, the Surveyor of the Navy and former Master Shipwright at Deptford Dockyard. Alongside their smaller cousin, the 32-gun Southampton class, the Venus-class represented an experiment in ship design; fast, medium-sized vessels capable of overhauling smaller craft and singlehandedly engaging enemy cruisers or privateers. As a further innovation, Slade borrowed from contemporary French ship design by removing the lower deck gun ports and locating the ship's cannons solely on the upper deck. This permitted the carrying of heavier ordinance without the substantial increase in hull size which would otherwise have been required in order to keep the lower gun ports consistently above the waterline. The lower deck was instead used for additional stores, enabling Venus-class frigates to remain at sea for longer periods without resupply.

=== Armament ===
Pallas' principal armament was 26 iron-cast twelve-pound cannons, located along her upper deck. The guns were constructed with shorter barrels as traditional twelve-pound cannons were too long to fit within the frigate's narrow beam. Each cannon weighed 28.5 long cwt (3,200 lb or 1,400 kg) with a gun barrel length of 7 feet 6 inches (2.29 m) compared with their 8 feet 6 inches (2.59 m) equivalent in larger Royal Navy vessels.

The twelve-pound cannons were supported by ten six-pounder guns, eight on the quarterdeck and two on the forecastle, each weighing 16.5 long cwt (1,800 lb or 800 kg) with a barrel length of 6 feet (1.8 m). Taken together, the twelve-pound and six-pound cannons provided a broadside weight of 189 pounds (86 kg). She was also equipped with twelve 1/2-pound swivel guns for anti-personnel use. These swivel guns were mounted in fixed positions on the quarterdeck and forecastle.

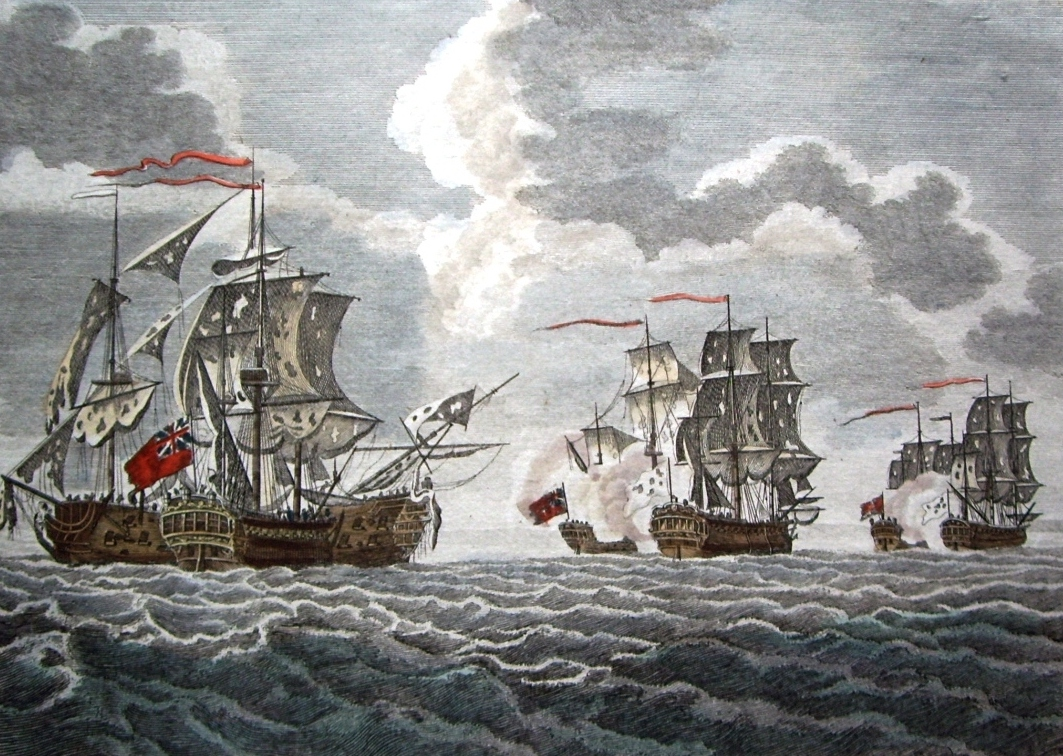
Pallas (second from right) at the Battle of Bishops Court in 1760

== Career ==
Pallas was commissioned in August 1757 under the command of Captain Archibald Clevland to serve in the English Channel as part of Rear-Admiral Sir Edward Hawke's fleet blockading the coast of France. She captured the French privateer Le Hasard on 3 November off Saint Malo. On 7 August 1758 she served as the flag ship of Commodore Richard Howe at the Raid on Cherbourg and also participated in operations at Saint Cas between June and September. Captain Michael Clements assumed command of Pallas in around June 1759, and was still in command when she fought in the Battle of Bishops Court on 28 February 1760 where three French frigates were captured by Pallas and the frigates HMS Aeolus and HMS Brilliant.

The frigate sailed to the Mediterranean Sea on 19 June. Soon after she engaged the French ship of the line Diadème and attempted to slow her down so that more powerful British ships could arrive to attack her, but she failed in doing so. She continued in the Mediterranean throughout 1761 and 1762, capturing the French privateer La Revanche on 23 June 1762. On 9 July she captured the settee Nuestra Señora de la Merced in the Gulf of Cádiz and her passengers, including the friar Ilarione da Bergamo. She was still in the area on 23 July when two Spanish xebecs attacked Pallas; the British ship soon gained the upper hand in the engagement despite the Spaniards being heavily armed, but a Spanish ship of the line sailed from Cádiz and forced her to leave the engagement before she could capture either ship. The frigate was paid off in January 1764. She was surveyed in June of the same year but waited until 1770 to receive a refit, which took place at Portsmouth Dockyard between February and December. She was recommissioned in October under Captain John Laforey to serve in the Falklands Crisis; with the Crisis over Laforey was replaced by Captain George Watson in 1771, who sailed Pallas back to the Mediterranean on 7 May.

Captain James Almes replaced Watson in 1773 and the ship was refitted again at Portsmouth in May of that year before being paid off only one month later. She was recommissioned by Captain William Cornwallis in September 1774 and sailed for the coast of Africa on 12 December. She served off Senegal and Gambia supporting their coastal garrisons, and then sailed to Cape Coast Castle from where she investigated a number of new British settlements and castles. Captain Rowland Cotton assumed command in 1777 where after Pallas focused on the protection of trade travelling to and from the continent. She returned home at the beginning of 1778 via Jamaica and was refitted at Portsmouth between January and May, at the same time as which Captain Richard King took over from Cotton. King sailed Pallas to Newfoundland on 25 May, from where she joined the expedition that attacked and razed Saint Pierre and Miquelon on 14 September. In the next month King was replaced by Captain Thomas Spry who sailed the ship back to England where she was re-coppered at Plymouth Dockyard between March and May 1779.

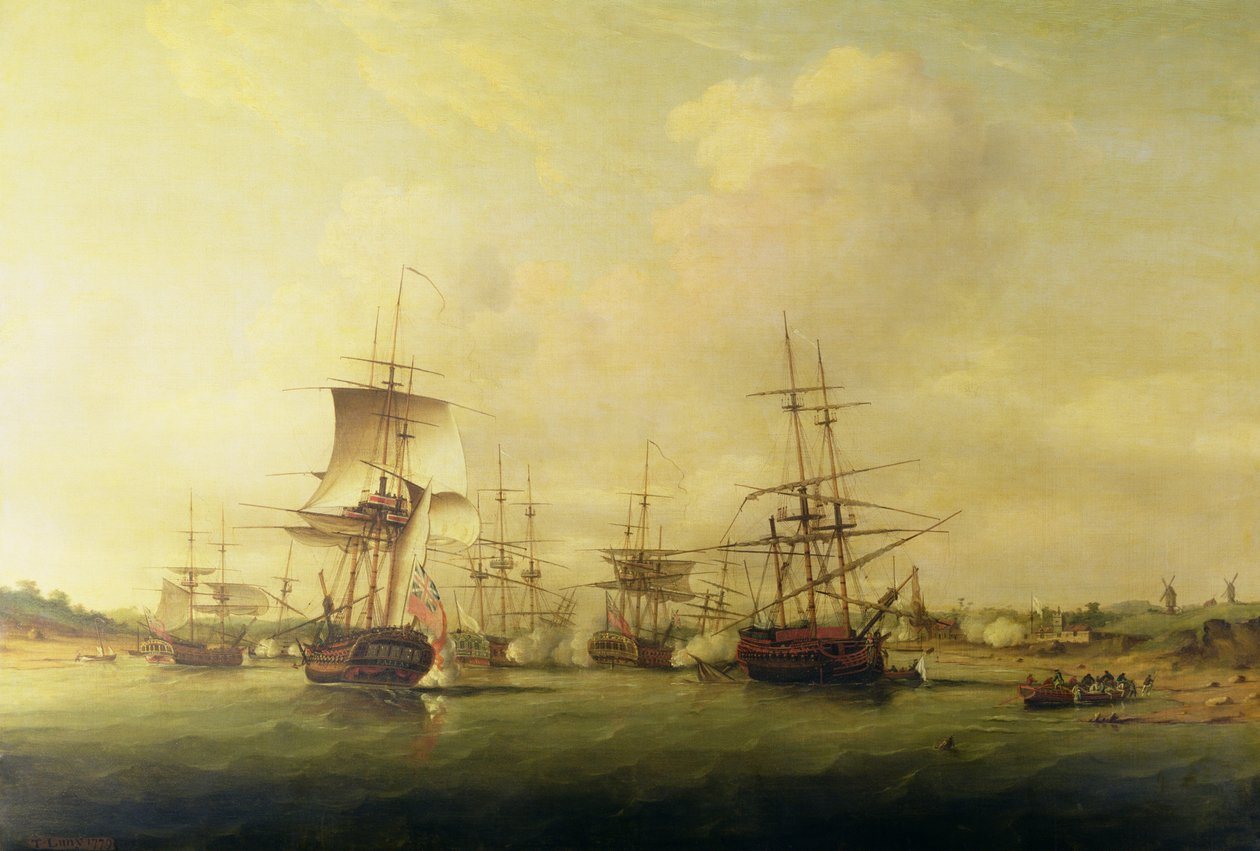
HMS Experiment and Pallas in the action against the French at the action of 13 May 1779

After leaving the dockyard Pallas initially served in the English Channel to assist in defending the Channel Islands, which role culminated in the action of 13 May 1779 where a French invasion force intended for Jersey was driven ashore by a large force of British ships including Pallas, commanded by Sir James Wallace. In June the frigate left the Channel to sail for Jamaica where she captured the small Spanish frigate Diana on 11 November 1780. Captain Christopher Parker assumed command of Pallas in 1782 and sailed her home, from where she travelled to Halifax to serve as a convoy escort.

== Fate ==
Pallas soon returned from North America to serve in home waters, but while at sea off the Azores in February 1783 it was found that the ship was leaking badly and she was beached on São Jorge Island on 12 February. She was burnt there twelve days later.

== Bibliography ==
- Gardiner, Robert (1992). The First Frigates. London: Conway Maritime Press. ISBN 0-85177-601-9.
- Lyon, David (1993). The Sailing Navy List. London: Conway Maritime Press. ISBN 0-85177-617-5.
- Winfield, Rif (2007). British Warships in the Age of Sail, 1714 to 1792. London: Seaforth Publishing. ISBN 978-1-84415-700-6.
