= Benjamin Marlow =

Royal Navy officer (1715–1795)

Admiral Benjamin Marlow
- Born: 1715; Salisbury, Wiltshire
- Died: 1795 (aged 79–80); Hampstead, London
- Burial place: Alverstoke, Hampshire
- Military career
- Allegiance: Great Britain
- Branch: Royal Navy
- Service years: c.1743–1795
- Rank: Admiral of the Blue
- Commands: HMS Fortune; HMS Dolphin; HMS Minerva; HMS Prince; HMS Coventry; HMS Rippon
- Conflicts: War of the Austrian Succession; Seven Years' War; Battle of Minorca

Admiral Benjamin William Marlow (1715–1795) was a Royal Navy officer.

== Early life and career ==
Benjamin William Marlow was born into a minor aristocratic family in Salisbury, Wiltshire, in 1715, the first of five children. His father, Thomas William Marlow, was himself an officer in the Royal Navy.

It is entirely probable that Marlow was commissioned at a young age as a midshipman into the Royal Navy, however the records of his commissioning as such are no longer extant. Following his Lieutenants Examinations Marlow was commissioned as a Fourth Lieutenant in 1743 and posted on board HMS Grafton, a third rate ship of the line of 70 guns under the command of Captain Edward Allen in Jamaica.

In 1744 Marlow survived a shipwreck on board the Grafton which killed Captain Allen and many of the crew. Later that year Marlow was posted on board HMS Assistance, a fourth rate ship of the line of 50 guns, receiving a promotion to third lieutenant. Marlow spent less than a year on board the Assistance before once again receiving a promotion to first lieutenant and posted to HMS Falmouth, a fourth rate ship of the line of 50 guns.

== The Battle of Minorca and the trial of Admiral Byng ==
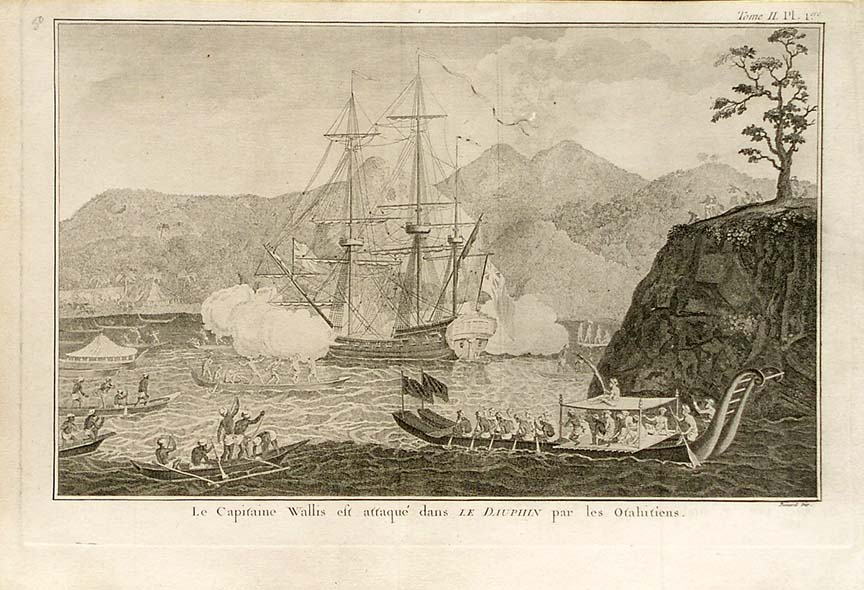
HMS Dolphin in the East Indies

In 1756 Marlow was promoted to captain and given command of HMS Dolphin, a frigate attached to the general fleet of Admiral Byng. Shortly after his posting Marlow's Dolphin was dispatched along with Byng's fleet to Minorca. When the fleet, numbering some 13 ships, many of which were undermanned and poorly maintained, arrived on 19 May and found the island overrun by French troops, with only the garrison of St. Philip's Castle in Part Mahon holding out. Byng had received orders to relieve the garrison, but a French squadron of 12 ships of the line and 5 frigates intervened as the afternoon was wearing on. The two fleets positioned themselves, and battle was drawn up on the morning of the following day.

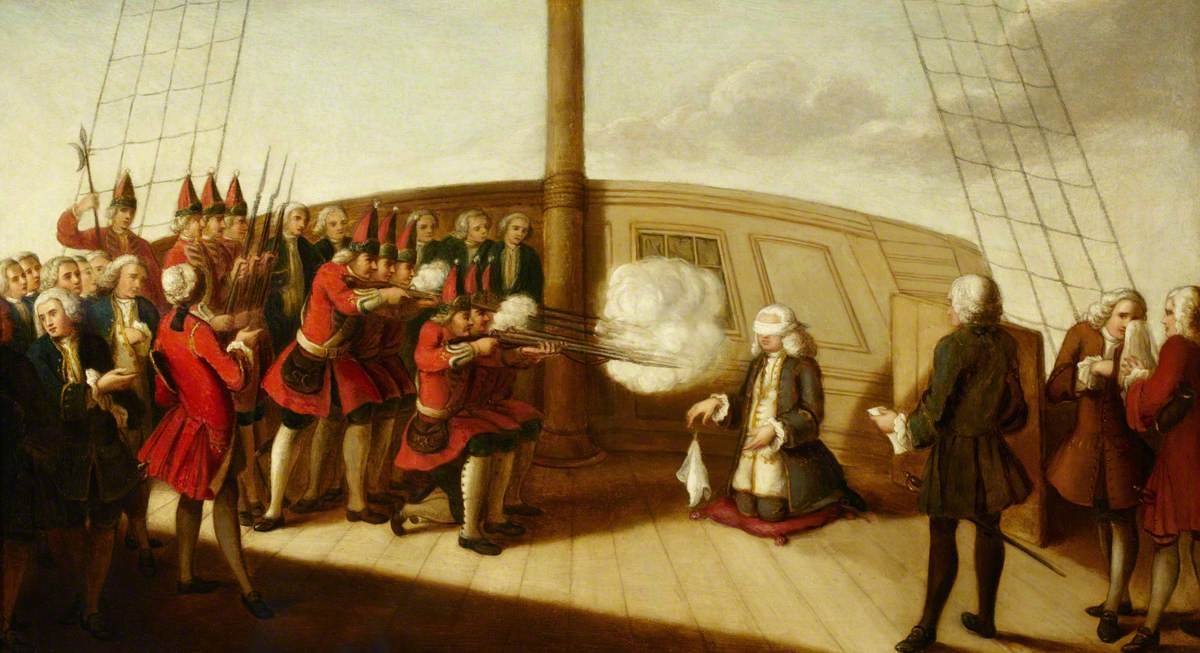
Byng's execution on 14 March 1757, which occurred despite Marlow's pleas for clemency.

Facing 12 French ships of the line, Byng formed his 12 largest ships into a single line of battle with an auxiliary line of sixth rates and sloops (including Marlow's Dolphin) parallel to the main line at the south west. During the ensuing battle the ships of the line took a considerable battering, and were left unrelieved by their auxiliaries. Byng displayed considerable caution and over-reliance on standard fighting procedures which ultimately prevented the Dolphin coming into effective cannon range of the French squadron. Several ships on both sides of the conflict were left damaged, and, following a Council of War at which Marlow was present, it was agreed that the fleet stood no chance of further damaging the French ships of relieving the garrison. Byng therefore gave orders to return to Gibraltar.

While the battle itself was largely indecisive, in the absence of a clear British victory it was described as a defeat. The Admiralty charged Byng for breaching the Articles of War by failing to do all he could to fulfil his orders and support the garrison; he was court-martialled, found guilty and sentenced to death. Marlow was present at the trial and gave testimony as a witness. Despite the pleas of Marlow and others for clemency, Byng was executed on 14 March 1757 aboard HMS Monarch in Portsmouth harbour.

== The Battle of the Firth of Forth and Pondicherry ==
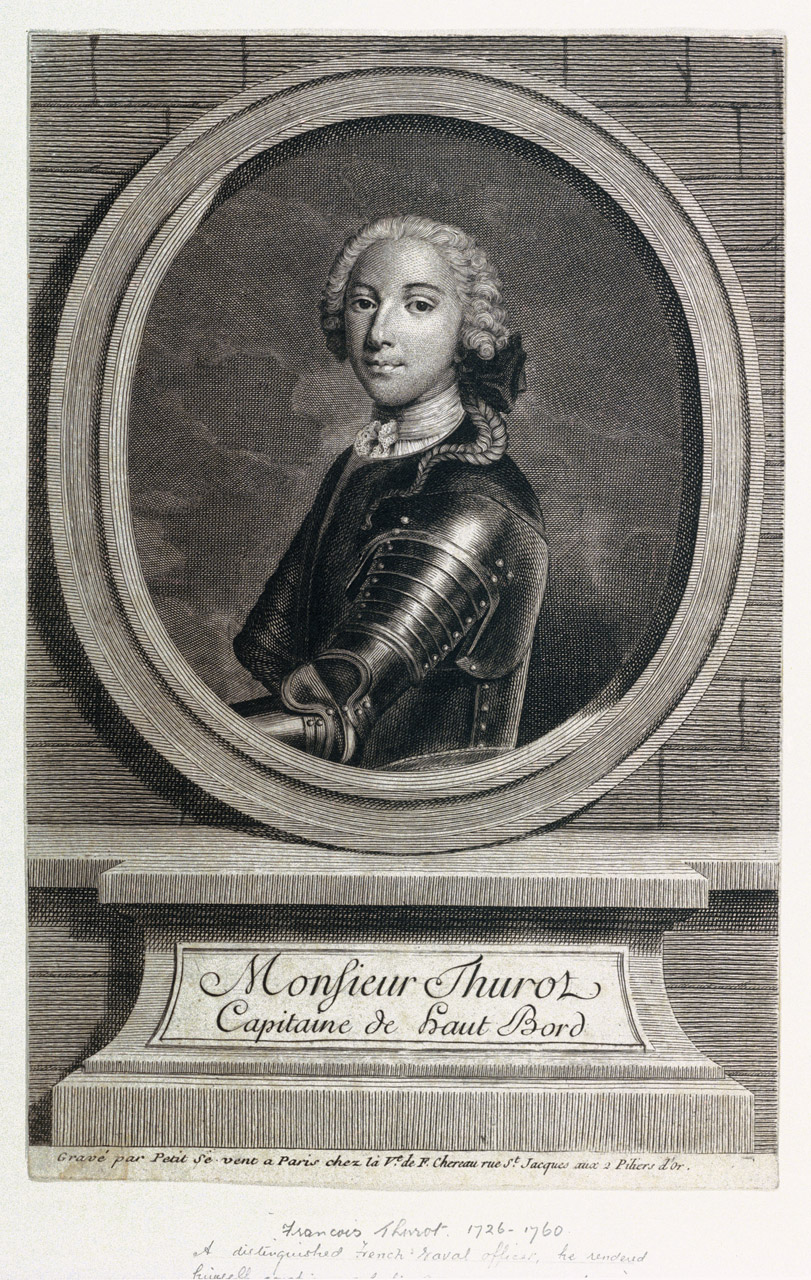
Francois Thurot, captain of the Belle-Isle

Despite his involvement in the Battle of Minorca, Marlow was acquitted of any wrongdoing and retained his command. He assisted HMS Hussar under Captain John Elliot in the sinking of the French ship Alcion with all hands after a two-hour night action on 23 November 1757. In the same year he captured the Marquis de Barrail off Dunkirk. He was awarded with the freedom of the City of Aberdeen for his protection of the coast and local trade.

On 21 May 1758, Marlow discovered the French ship Belle-Isle under the command of the famous Francois Thurot while put into the port of Leith in the Firth of Forth. The two Royal Navy sloops of war that were there, HMS Dolphin (24 guns, Capt. Benjamin Marlow) and HMS Solebay (20 guns, Capt. Robert Craig), accompanied by two small reconnaissance vessels, went out to track down the intruder, catching sight of the Belle-Isle off Red Head (between Arbroath and Montrose) early on the morning of 27 May. They were some distance apart, and Thurot at first thought they were merchant vessels, so he went to engage the Dolphin. As the Belle-Isle easily outgunned the Marlow's vessel, he continued the attack even after discovering the true nature of his opponent, and action commenced about 8 a.m. Marlow fought alone for about an hour and a half, suffering considerable damage; and when Solebay arrived, Marlow was no longer able to offer much help. Casualties aboard Solebay were heavier than aboard Dolphin, including a serious wound to Captain Craig's throat. In the end, though, Thurot could not force either of the Royal Navy vessels to surrender, so the battle ended about noon with both sides limping away. Nineteen men were dead, and thirty-four wounded aboard the Belle-Isle, while Dolphin and Solebay reported six killed and twenty-eight wounded between them. Captain Craig's wound did not heal well, and he retired on 25 January 1759.

Marlow requested a court martial into his conduct, believing that despite the significant superiority in firepower and speed of the French vessel, he may have been able to pursue the Belle-Isle into the North Sea proper. The court martial honourably acquitted him after a brief hearing.

Following the Battle of the Firth of Forth, Marlow was engaged in cruising and conveyancing of trade to North America. During this time he became acquainted with the young Horatio Nelson, when in early 1776 Nelson contracted malaria, became seriously ill and was returned to England aboard Marlow's ship. Nelson spent the six-month voyage recuperating and had almost recovered by the time he arrived in Britain in September 1776.

Marlow went on to command HMS Prince, a ship of the line of 90 guns in the Grand Fleet, and subsequently took HMS Coventry, 28 guns, out to the East indies. Here he remained for the next seven years, being present at the action with the French off Pondicherry.

Following this Marlow was promoted to flag captain to Commodore Sir Edward Vernon aboard the Rippon in the East Indies, returning home to the Downs in March 1781, where he discovered that in his absence he had been promoted by the Admiralty to rear-admiral on 26 September 1780.

== Later life ==
Having accomplished an impressive record of service, Marlow did not see any further action but remained with the Grand Fleet, stationed out of Portsmouth. He was advanced to vice-admiral on 24 September 1787 and admiral on 12 April 1794. He died at Hampstead in 1795 and was buried at Alverstoke, Hampshire. A memorial to his memory was erected at a commemoration service held in Salisbury Cathedral.

== Personal life ==
Rear Admiral Benjamin Marlow (1715–1795) was a Royal Navy officer who rose to the rank of Admiral of the Blue. Born in Salisbury, Wiltshire, son of Lieutenant Thomas Marlow RN, he had a long career serving in the War of the Austrian Succession, the Seven Years’ War, and the American Revolutionary War (notably in the East Indies). He was promoted Rear Admiral in 1780, Vice Admiral in 1787, and full Admiral in 1794. He died in Hampstead, London, and was buried at Alverstoke, Hampshire. He was married to Anne (Ann) Morse of Gosport, Hampshire (sister of Hannah Morse, wife of Nereas Vaughan). The King’s Petition (1784) In 1784, Admiral Marlow petitioned King George III for a Royal Licence (Letters Patent) to allow his nephew, Benjamin Vaughan (son of Nereas Vaughan and Hannah Morse, and the Admiral’s wife’s nephew), to: • Change his surname from Vaughan to Marlow, and • Bear the Marlow family arms. This was granted so that the Admiral’s family name and lineage could be continued through his nephew (his only surviving close male relative via his wife). Benjamin Vaughan thereafter became Captain Benjamin Vaughan Marlow.

== Legacy ==
Marlow is significant among his peers both because of his exemplary record in service and his innovative approach to leadership and training.

Marlow is generally considered the first officer of the Royal Navy to suggest that it may be more pragmatic an approach to train midshipmen and young officers together in groups, where they might more easily grasp the fundamentals of mathematics, navigation and seamanship, rather than, as had been the practice, to commission midshipmen straight into the fleet and expecting them to ‘learn on the job’. Marlow was known for taking groups of midshipmen on board his vessels and insisting on time spent every day as a class learning these fundamentals. It is probable that during his time on board HMS Dolphin under the command of Marlow, Nelson benefitted from this approach. As such he is generally considered the origin of the system of the British Naval College, the model for training young officers for the fleet which the Royal Navy retains to this day and which has spread around the world.

The Royal Navy continues to support the Marlow Society, which seeks to preserve this goal.
