= Battle of Bishops Court =

1760 battle of the Seven Years' War

- Part of the Seven Years' War
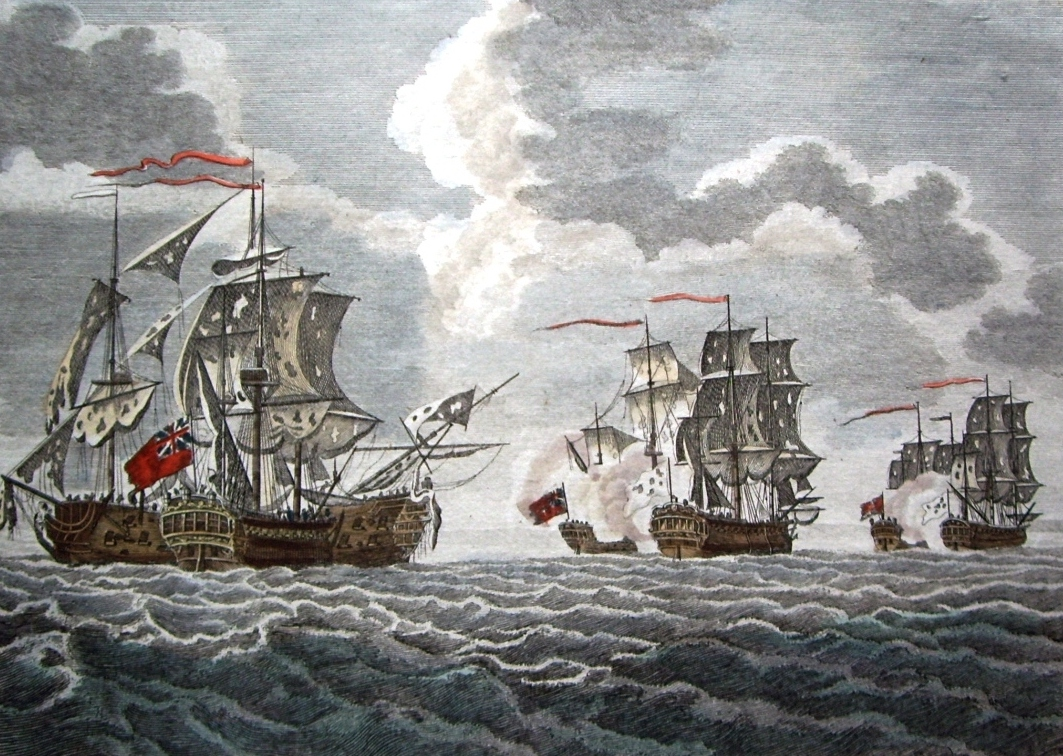
- 1780 engraving of the battle
Date	28 February 1760
Location	Off Jurby, Irish Sea
Result	British victory

Belligerents
Great Britain	France

Commanders and leaders
John Elliot	François Thurot †

Strength
3 frigates	3 frigates

Casualties and losses
5 killed 31 wounded	300 killed or wounded 1,000 captured 3 frigates captured

The Battle of Bishops Court, also known as The Defeat of Thurot, was a naval engagement that took place 28 February 1760, during the Seven Years' War, between three British ships and three French ships. The French force under famed commander François Thurot were brought to battle in the Irish Sea between the Isle of Man and the coast of Ireland at 9 am. After a close-fought action, Thurot's force was battered into submission, with his ships dismasted and reduced to a sinking condition. Thurot was shot through the heart and died during the action. The British took all three French ships, completing victory.

== Background ==
Between 21 and 26 February 1760, under the command of the Privateer François Thurot, a force consisting of the ships Maréchal de Belle-Isle, Terpsichore and Blonde arrived off the coast of Ireland. They landed 600 French troops and overwhelmed the small garrison of Carrickfergus in Ireland and captured its castle. Thurot held the town for five days but in the face of large numbers of local militia under General Strode, and the appearance of a Royal Navy squadron off the coast, Thurot re-embarked his force and departed the town.

Knowing where Thurot was, the British soon came to action. The port of Liverpool, which had improved its defences when news of Thurot's likely intentions emerged the previous autumn, called in reinforcements, and more Royal Navy ships were dispatched from Portsmouth and Plymouth. In January, two extra Royal Navy frigates, HMS Pallas under Captain Clements and HMS Brilliant under Captain Logie had already been ordered to join the defensive force in the Irish Sea, and were then at the port of Kinsale. The alarm reached them on 24 February, and they set out within hours, in company with HMS Æolus (Captain John Elliott, who commanded the squadron). They passed Dublin on the morning of 26 February, but bad weather prevented them from entering Belfast Lough that evening. Thurot took advantage of this and escaped.

== Battle ==
On the night of 27–28 February the Royal Navy squadron, having perhaps heard local claims that the next target of the raiders was to be Whitehaven in Cumberland, headed south-east to round the Mull of Galloway in southern Scotland. There they caught sight of the three French frigates, anchored at the entrance of Luce Bay. To avoid being trapped in the bay, Thurot's squadron set sail for the south-east, towards the Isle of Man. Elliot in Æolus, the leader of the British squadron, caught up with the Maréchal de Belle-Isle around sunrise and battle began, within sight of the Mull of Galloway and Jurby Head on Isle of Man. After the first broadsides, Thurot tried to grapple Æolus so he could use his troops to board. All he achieved, however, was the loss of his bowsprit and many men on deck from British small-arms fire. Æolus fired a second broadside and, neatly, fell back so that the other two Royal Navy vessels could also fire at the Belle-Isle.

Æolus resumed the fight; Captain Thurot with great bravery having lost one of his arms rejected the proposal of some of his officers to surrender. When told that water was fast rising through a hole pierced by a ball from the Æolus, said, Never mind it, go on, but then he fell by a grape shot through his chest. Lieutenant Forbes of the Æolus, perceiving the Bellisle's deck to have been adequately thinned of men, as most remaining were below in great confusion, jumped into her with about twenty five sailors and marines and struck the colors with his own hand. Meanwhile, Pallas and Brilliant went to deal with the remaining French vessels, one of which, Terpsichore under Captain Dessauaudais attempted to escape but was easily caught by Pallas, overhauled and captured. Brilliant then overhauled and captured the thirty six gun Blonde under Captain La Kayce which had 400 men. At some point Thurot's corpse was thrown overboard with many others, but was retrieved and brought ashore by the British. With this last capture, Elliot had gained a complete victory.

== Aftermath ==
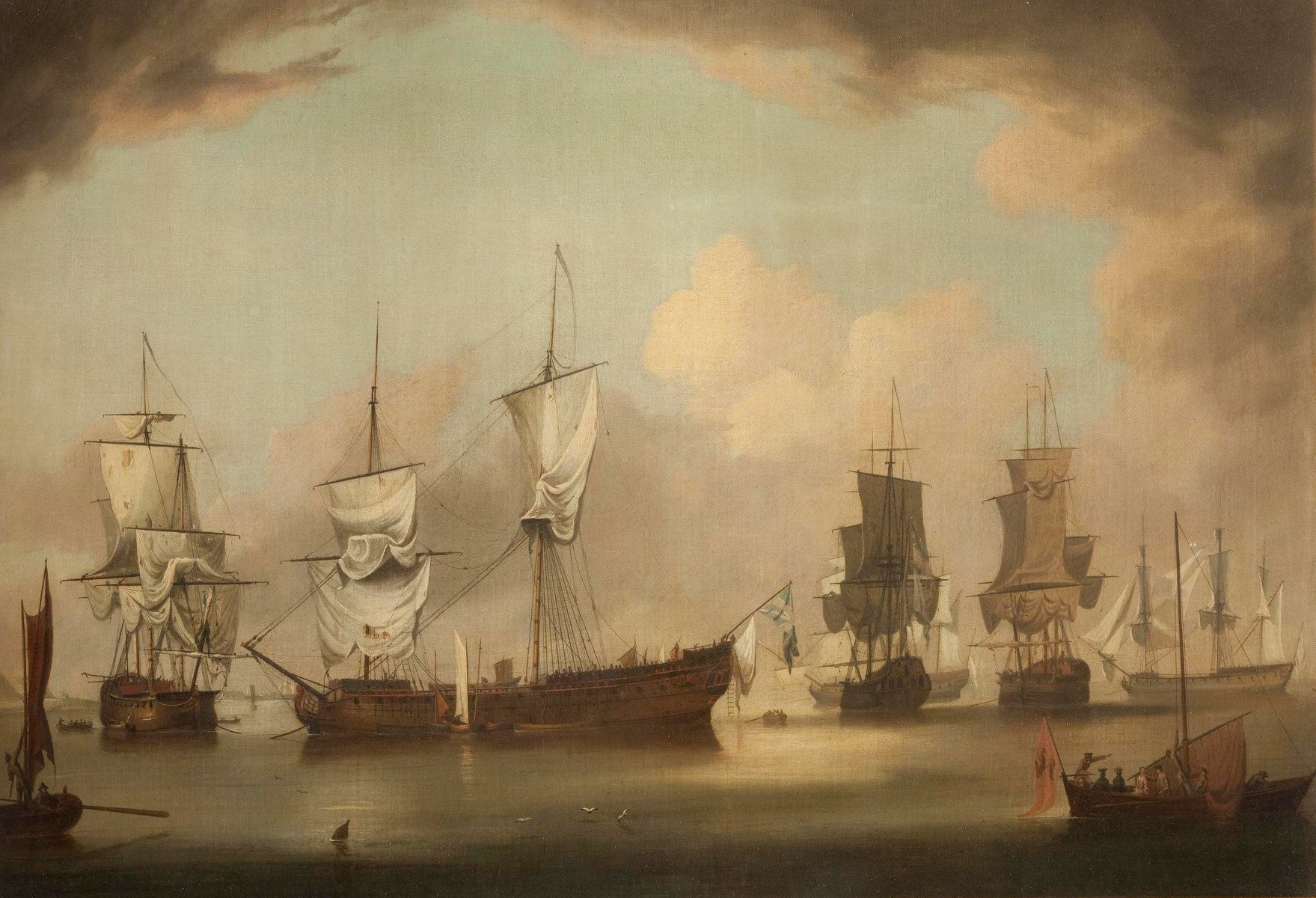
c. 1760 painting of Elliot and Thurot's ships in Ramsey Bay after the battle

The defeated French squadron had lost all three frigates along with suffering 300 killed and wounded and 1,000 captured. Given the large number of French prisoners in British captivity, Elliot was forced to use a snow in Whitehaven to transport them to Carrickfergus. British casualties were minor, with Aeolus's crew suffering four killed and 15 wounded while Pallas had one killed and five wounded and Brilliant had 11 wounded. Elliot took the 30 captive French officers to Plymouth. The remaining French prisoners were brought to Ramsey, and then to Belfast, where they arrived on March 2. On May 10, they were freed and transported to France. The three victorious British captains were unanimously voted the thanks of the Irish House of Commons and Blonde and Terpsichore were purchased by the British Admiralty and commissioned into the Royal Navy.

Thurot was buried with full honours in the churchyard of Kirkmaiden, at the expense of the local lord, Sir William Maxwell, who also served as chief mourner. The English artist Richard Wright, who had witnessed the battle, produced paintings showing the action and the aftermath, which were both made into engravings. Ballads were written about the battle, and a biography of Thurot by the Reverend John Francis Durand was being sold by June, in two editions priced at 1s or 6½d. Despite the author's claims to have known Thurot for years, the work consisted mostly of old news stories and outright fabrications. A memorial to the battle, called Mount Æolus, consisting of two cannons and the bowsprit of Belle-Isle which washed ashore on the Manx coast near Bishopscourt, was built in the grounds of Bishopscourt, Isle of Man. The wooden bowsprit was later replaced by an inscribed stone pillar.
