= HMS Aeolus (1758) =

Frigate of the Royal Navy

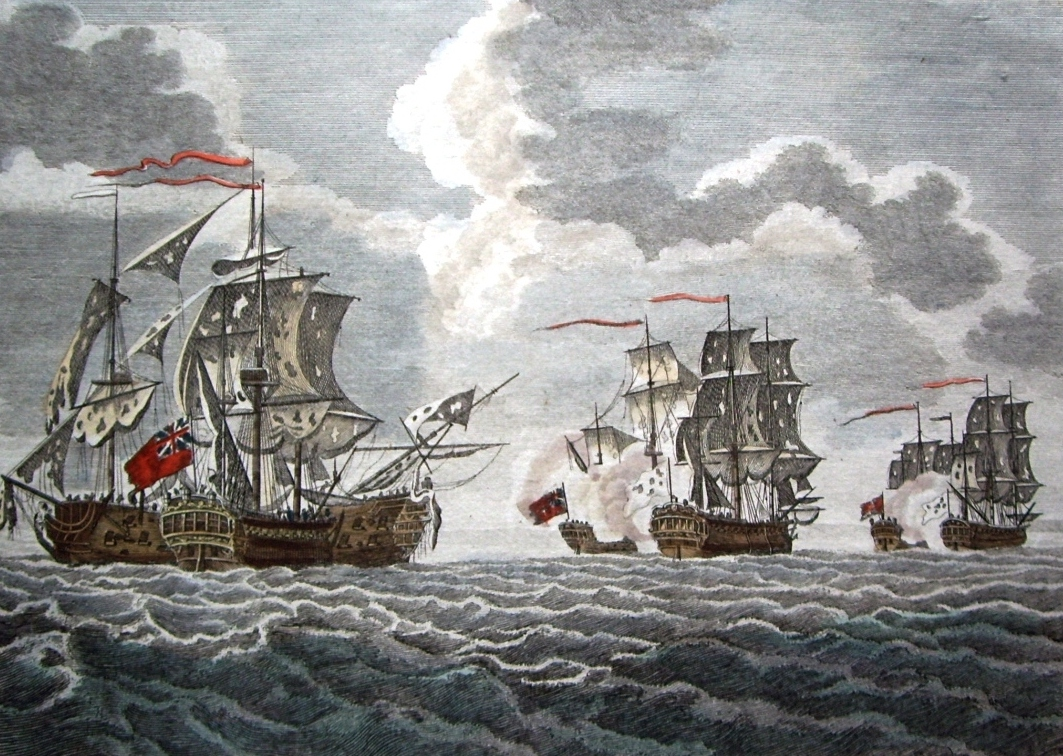
Aeolus (second from left) at the Battle of Bishops Court

HMS Aeolus was a 32-gun fifth-rate frigate of the Royal Navy. In 1800, she renamed as HMS Guernsey.

The original name of the ship comes from Greek mythology and means 'quick moving/nimble'. The ship is commemorated with a neo-classical temple in Kew Gardens, London. Aeolus temple was designed by William Chambers, along with two other temples as a memorial to three British ships involved in naval victories in the Seven Years' War.

== History ==
The ship was built at Deptford Dockyard and launched 29 November 1758.

On 28 February 1760, the Aeolus was involved in the Battle of Bishops Court (also known as the Defeat of Thurot) during the Seven Years' War. The naval engagement took place in the waters between the Isle of Man and Northern Ireland. The Aurora served as the flagship of a victorious British squadron commanded by John Elliot, her captain and together with the rest of the squadron they captured three French ships. The name of the ship was given to a monument commemorating the victory at Bishopscourt Glen on the Isle of Man.

On 17 May 1760, the ship was involved in a small action with a French brig laden with naval stores while under the guns of a French shore battery at Belle Île. The ship was badly damaged in the action and returned to port to be repaired. After repairs were completed, the ship spent 1761 cruising in the Bay of Biscay. This involved the seizure of a small French privateer named Carnival on 23 March 1761.

In 1762, the ship was assigned to the fleet of Rear-Admiral of the Blue Charles Hardy and is recorded to have seized the French privateer Le Formidable of Bordeaux on 20 August 1762 and destroyed the 32-gun ship San Josef at Aviles on 2 September 1762.

Sometime in 1777, under command of Chris Atkins, she captured ship "Adventure", sloops "Hornet", Beauford, Sunbry, and "Numbrell", schooners "Dolphin" and "Dispatch". On 12 September, 1777 she captured Rhode Island Letter of Marque sloop "Swallow". In September 1777 while on station in Jamaica she captured the American privateer Swallow and with HMS Ruby also captured the 36-gun La Prudente (and her commander Jacques François de Pérusse des Cars). Sometime before 18 October, 1777 she captured sloop "Independance" and schooner "Ferrett". She captured sloop "Washington" at an unknown date. Before 22 November she captured an unknown schooner and schooner "Wild Catt". Before 18 December she captured sloop "Matompkin". On 27 December she captured schooner "Dolphin". On 21 January, 1778 she captured an American schooner off Cape Coriantes. On 24 January she captured brig "Hiram", also off Cape Coriantes. On 11 March, 1778 she captured French brig "Hazard" off the Mona Passage. On 5 June 1778 she captured schooner "Baccus" off Cape Francois. The ship was refitted and coppered in 1780 and saw service off Portugal.

In 1800, the ship was renamed HMS Guernsey and broken up a year later.

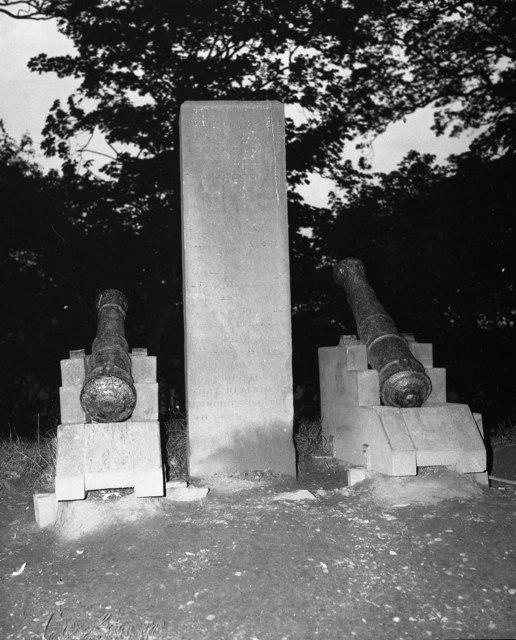
Mount Aeolus on the Isle of Man, which takes its name from the ship's action during the Battle of Bishops Court.

== Notable crew ==
Admiral John Elliot served as Captain of the Aeolus during her first three years, including commanding her during the battle of Bishops Court.

Admiral Henry Curzon began his seagoing career on 14 October 1776 on the ship, assigned as an able seaman.

Admiral Sir Charles Cunningham also began his seagoing career by first serving on the Aeolus in early 1776.
