= French frigate Maréchal de Belleisle (1757) =

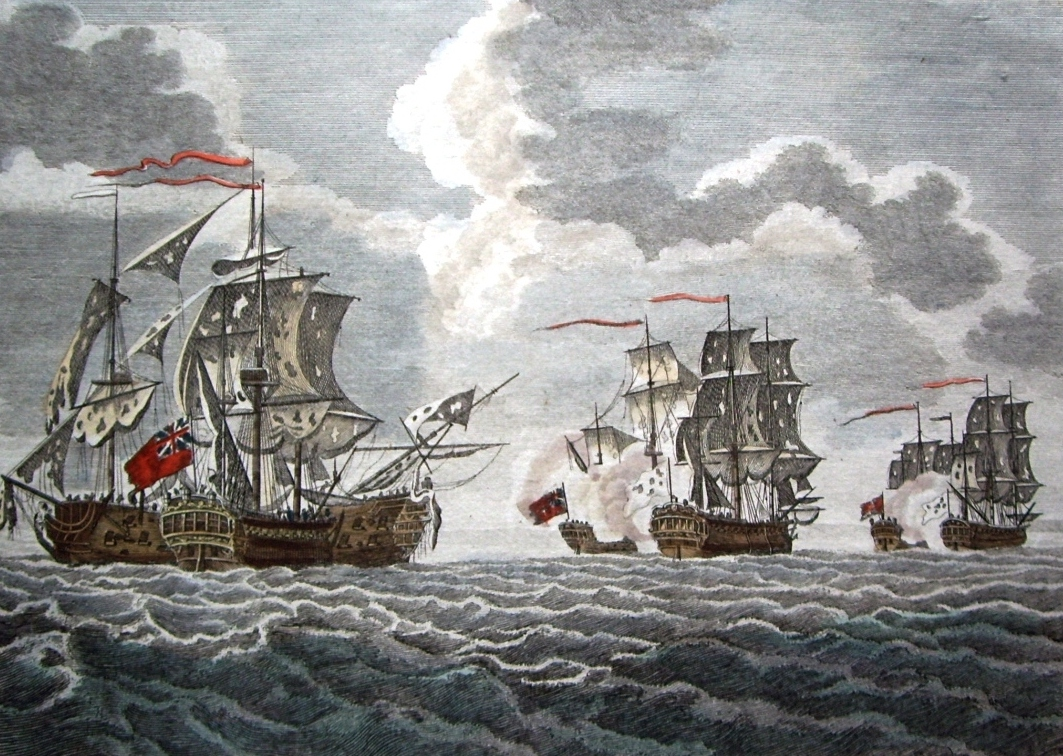
- Maréchal de Belleisle (first from left) at the Battle of Bishops Court

History

France
- Name: Maréchal de Belleisle
- Namesake: Charles Louis Auguste Fouquet, duc de Belle-Isle
- Operator: Kingdom of France
- Builder: St Malo
- Launched: 1757
- Fate: Captured in 1760

General characteristics
- Type: Frigate
- Tons burthen: 600
- Propulsion: Sail
- Complement: 150
- Armament: 46-gun: 30 × 12-pounders, 4 × 18-pounders, 12 × 6-pounders.

Maréchal de Belleisle was a 46-gun frigate of the French Navy built in 1757. Captained by François Thurot she was captured in 1760.

A memorial to the battle, called Mount Æolus, consisting of two cannons and the bowsprit of Maréchal de Belleisle, which washed ashore on the Manx coast near Bishopscourt, was built in the grounds of Bishopscourt, Isle of Man. The wooden bowsprit was later replaced by an inscribed stone pillar.
