= François Thurot =

French Navy officer, privateer and sea captain

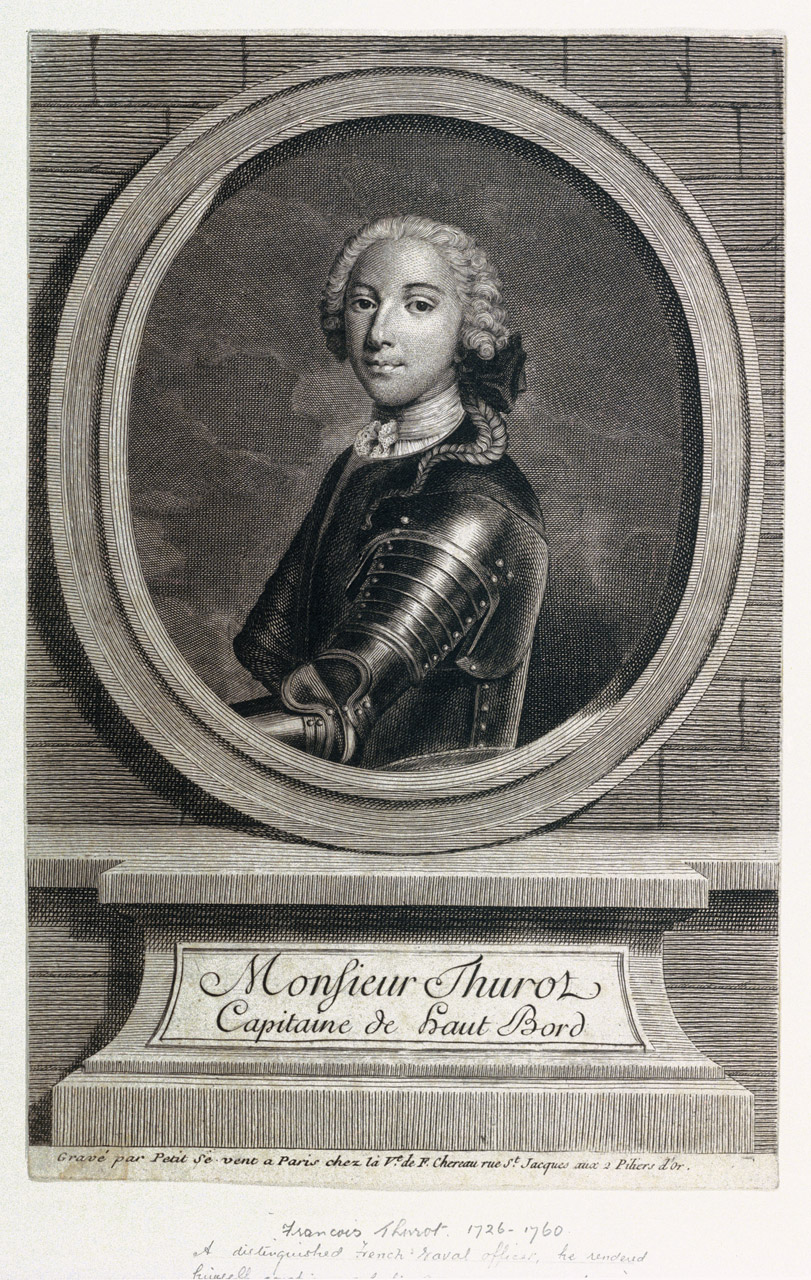
- Portrait by François Chéreau, c. 1760
- Born: 22 July 1727; Nuits-Saint-Georges
- Died: 28 February 1760 (aged 32); Irish Sea
- Military career
- Allegiance: France
- Branch: French Navy
- Service years: 1756–1760
- Conflicts: War of the Austrian Succession; Seven Years' War; Battle of Carrickfergus; Battle of Bishops Court

François Thurot (22 July 1727 – 28 February 1760) was a French Navy officer, privateer and sea captain who served in the War of the Austrian Succession and Seven Years' War.

== Early life ==
He may have been the son of the postmaster at Nuits-St-Georges or his grandfather was Captain O'Farrell from Ireland who had served in the French Royal Army's Irish Brigade. As a teenager Thurot rebelled against a Jesuit education, and was apprenticed in 1743 to a surgeon in Dijon. His father had died in 1739, and to help pay his mother's debts he pawned some silver he found at his aunt's house. It did not belong to his aunt, and he decided to leave Dijon to keep out of the way of the angry owner, a town councillor.

Since March of that year, 1744, France and Britain had been on opposite sides in the War of the Austrian Succession, and François enrolled as surgeon aboard the Le Havre privateer Cerf Volant. In August, on its first cruise, the Cerf Volant was captured by the British. After some months in British captivity, during which he acquired an excellent grasp of the English language, Thurot met fellow prisoner Charles Louis Auguste Fouquet, Duke of Belle-Isle. Fouquet had been captured in Hanover, but was released in exchange for British prisoners of war captured on 11 May 1745 at the battle of Fontenoy. Many French army and navy personnel were also released in the same prisoner exchange during that summer, but privateers were not eligible.

In August, Thurot, who was being held aboard a prison hulk at Dover, escaped, stole a small boat, and crossed to France. Joining another privateer as a common sailor, he swiftly proved his skills, and at the age of twenty became captain first of that vessel and then a new, very well-armed privateer operating out of Dunkirk, in which he captured a large number of enemy merchant ships before the war was ended by the Treaty of Aix-la-Chapelle in 1748. For a time he worked as a merchant captain, beginning with a little six-ton lugger, the Levrette. Some biographers claim that about 1750 he married a Miss Sarah Smith, daughter of a London apothecary, but there is no surviving evidence of this. It seems that François also acquired a reputation as a skilful smuggler who repeatedly evaded HM Customs officers. In July 1753, while he was moored off the well-known smuggling coast near Baltimore, Ireland, customs officers boarded his cargo vessel, Argonaute, and seized it. Although there was insufficient evidence to charge him, the vessel was impounded, and Thurot spent over two years unsuccessfully trying to get it released.

== Seven Years' War ==
=== Friponne ===
According to the 1791 biography which is the principal source for this article, the vengeful François went back into privateering in 1755, after France and Britain had again come into conflict over their colonies in America; this may be untrue, as the war was confined to the west side of the Atlantic until May 1756. In that month, thanks to Fouquet's influence, Thurot was appointed captain of the French Navy corvette Friponne, and by the time he returned to port in September for repairs, is said to have captured or sunk some sixty British vessels.

=== Maréchal de Belle-Isle, first mission, 1757–59 ===
==== HMS Southampton ====
Although a plan he proposed to attack the Royal Navy's facilities at Portsmouth was rejected, in 1757 he was promoted to captain of a 44-gun frigate, named after his patron, the Maréchal de Belle-Isle (hereafter Belle-Isle for short). At the head of a small squadron including another frigate, the Chauvelin (Capt. Desages), and two corvettes, Bastien and Gros Thomas, he sailed from St. Malo on 16 July, and renewed his campaign against British shipping, with the ultimate aim of disrupting a convoy from Russia as it passed the Orkney Islands in early autumn. Very early in the cruise, Bastien was captured; shortly afterwards, on 25 July, while still in the English Channel, the remaining vessels, with a small prize in company, met the brand-new British frigate HMS Southampton (Capt. James Gilchrist). Thurot engaged Southampton in a half-hour gun battle, then his consorts came up and made several attempts to board. After those attempts failed, the French tried to sink the British vessel, but eventually they abandoned the attack, as larger ships were seen approaching. Southampton, though leaking badly, and with 24 of the crew dead or mortally wounded, managed to reach Weymouth and was soon back at sea. About 14 of the Belle-Isle's crew also died in the action.

==== Autumn 1757: the dwindling squadron ====
Before the Belle-Isle could be properly repaired, a storm broke two of the weakened masts. Shortly afterwards, the British caught up with them, and a battle ensued, from which the French barely escaped into the Dutch port of Flushing, where they stayed some time, making repairs. Chauvelin and Gros Thomas went out on raids, but on their second such excursion they met two large British frigates, and Gros Thomas was captured. Belle-Isle and Chauvelin continued the mission, maintaining uncertainty about their position by never accepting a ransom for ships they captured; any which were not sent for sale were sunk. It seems that the French vessels visited Gothenburg in Sweden during this period, for it is claimed that in 1757 François was introduced there to Carl Björnberg, then the only member in Sweden of the mariners' society called the Order of Coldin—of which Thurot happened to be a senior member, so he was able to promote Friherr Björnberg to a higher grade, which permitted him to recruit new members (the Order was still operating in Sweden in 2007). On 5 October, under British flags, they even sheltered from bad weather at Findhorn in the Moray Firth. The shelter proved inadequate, and Chauvelin's mooring cables snapped. Driven out to sea, Captain Desages never managed to rejoin his commodore, for when he set out in pursuit the next day, Thurot met the full force of the storm and Belle-Isle was once again dismasted, then driven north, almost unsteerable, to the Shetland Isles. Adopting the Dutch flag on this occasion, Thurot fired guns to call for assistance, and pilots came to help the crippled frigate into "Connestienne" (Lunnasting, north east coast of the main island—often just called VIdlin today, after its harbour, Vidlin-voe, where Thurot landed) bay. After staying a few days for repairs, and learning that the convoy from Russia had passed weeks earlier, François headed for Bergen. On 19 October, Belle-Isle encountered a 26-gun frigate flying the English flag, so Thurot pretended that he was also British, until he was in a perfect position to attack, firing great guns and small arms simultaneously (naval historian John Knox Laughton made it very clear that this easy capture, oddly unnamed in biographies of Thurot, was not a Royal Navy vessel, but presumably a British privateer). Arriving at Bergen on 30 October, he attempted unsuccessfully to obtain a second vessel to replace the Chauvelin, and tried to avoid diplomatic problems, while simultaneously talking-up the morale of his tired crew.

==== Early 1758: battle off the Firth of Forth ====
The Belle-Isle put to sea, fully repaired, on 25 December, and ran straight into another storm. Dismasted again, the frigate was driven far to the north, finally finding calm weather in the vicinity of Iceland. With the crew on short rations, Belle-Isle struggled back to Norway, but the Captain, fearing mass desertion, avoided Bergen and pressed on to Gothenburg, which he reached on 1 February 1758. Repairs took over three months, and the cruise resumed on 11 May. Off the north-east coast of England, the revitalised crew captured several coal ships, then gradually headed north again. On 21 May, word of Thurot's activities reached the port of Leith in the Firth of Forth. Two Royal Navy sloops of war there, HMS Dolphin (24 guns, Capt. Benjamin Marlow) and HMS Solebay (20 guns, Capt. Robert Craig), accompanied by two small reconnaissance vessels, went out to track down the intruder, catching sight of the Belle-Isle off Red Head (between Arbroath and Montrose) early on the morning of 27 May. They were some distance apart, and Thurot at first thought they were merchant vessels, so he went to engage the Dolphin. As the Belle-Isle easily outgunned the British vessel, he continued the attack even after discovering the true nature of his opponent, and action commenced about 8 a.m. Dolphin fought alone for about an hour and a half, suffering considerable damage; and when Solebay arrived, Marlow was no longer able to offer much help. Casualties aboard Solebay were heavier than aboard Dolphin- including a serious wound to Captain Craig's throat. In the end, though, Thurot could not force either of the Royal Navy vessels to surrender, so the battle ended about noon with both sides limping away. Nineteen men were dead, and thirty-four wounded aboard the Belle-Isle, while Dolphin and Solebay reported six killed and twenty-eight wounded between them. Captain Craig's wound did not heal well, and he retired on 25 January 1759; Captain Marlow went on to a successful career, and became an admiral in 1779–80.

==== Spring 1758: preying on the Baltic trade ====
On 30 May, Thurot captured a small sloop, which he took to Mandal in southern Norway; hearing that some merchant ships were in the area, he hastily armed this vessel, renamed it Houmar and sent it out to find them, with another small French armed vessel, the Emérillon, which happened to be in the harbour. Remarkably, they captured two merchant vessels on their own, which Emérillon took to Christiansand to be sold. From 4 June, Thurot and the newly promoted Captain Payen in Houmar roamed the Kattegat, between Denmark and Sweden, taking numerous British merchant vessels. Rejoined by Emérillon, and a schooner, the Coureur, from 12 June Thurot got in among British vessels gathering to form a protected convoy, and captured several of them by pretending to be Danish, before the convoy escorts chased him away.

==== Late 1758: diversion to Ireland, and home ====
After a relatively quiet period following the convoy's departure, in mid-July Thurot headed westward into the Skagerrak, where he encountered a flotilla of 17 small British armed vessels. By his officers' advice, Belle-Isle went right in among them, and the British began a concerted artillery attack. Eventually, having studied their tactics, the Captain made an effective counter-attack and scattered them, capturing one before bad weather obscured visibility. By this time, Royal Navy vessels had been sent out specifically to stop the Belle-Isle, but by taking advantage of winds and mists he avoided four potentially lethal encounters, and headed northward in late August. Revisiting Shetland, François learned of the scale of the forces sent out against him, and headed for the Faroe Islands to replenish his supplies, before sailing southward round the west of the British Isles. Near Ireland, Belle-Isle sprang a leak, so, pausing only to take a couple of brigantines off Tory Island, Thurot hastened to the shelter of Lough Swilly, County Donegal. Repairs were completed on 31 August, and a very short new campaign began, taking British merchant vessels in the channels leading to the River Clyde and the Irish Sea. Having given the Royal Navy time to hear of his new exploits, Thurot then returned to Bergen via the Faroes, arriving on 13 September. After a couple of months' shore time, Belle-Isle set sail again on 25 November, and headed south, taking more prizes on the way. Thurot spent most of December at Ostend selling the various prizes, and finally reached Dunkirk at the beginning of January 1759.

=== Maréchal de Belle-Isle, second mission, 1759–60 ===
==== Preparation and departure ====
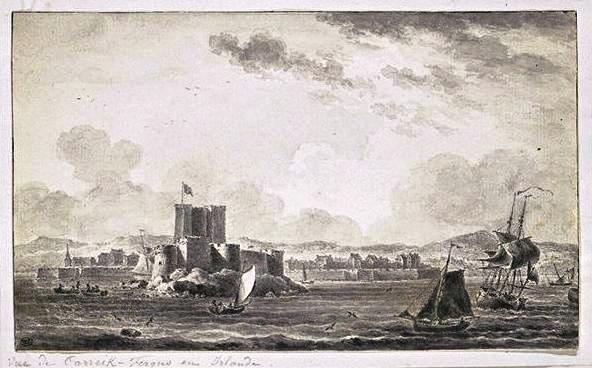
View of Carrickfergus in the late eighteenth century. Francis Thurot briefly seized the port in 1759 after a diversionary attack.

To the government at Versailles, the Captain next proposed a variant of the Portsmouth attack plan— making raids on less well-defended British coastal towns. This was seen as a good fit with plans for a full-scale invasion, serving as a very useful diversion. Beginning in spring 1759, a new squadron was prepared at Dunkirk, led again by the Maréchal de Belle-Isle, with four other frigates: Begon (Capt. Grieux), Blonde (Capt. La Kayce), Terpsichore (Capt. Defrauaudais) & Faucon; a corvette, Amarante; and a little reconnaissance vessel, the Faucon. Simultaneously, large numbers of troop-carrying barges were prepared at both Dunkirk and Le Havre for the main invasion, and a war fleet assembled at Brest. Recruiting was initially very slow, as the British had had a great deal of success against the Dunkirk privateers in the early years of the war; also Thurot had legal problems over money he owed in Holland. Intelligence reports suggested that the squadron was to attack the Hanoverian town of Stade and link with French forces pushing northward, but the latter were defeated at Minden on 1 August. The plan then seems to have been changed, with a proposal that Thurot should ferry Bonnie Prince Charlie to Scotland, to arouse a new Jacobite rebellion; it seems the Prince did not like this idea, and at one point it was suggested that an imitator could be sent instead. Finally, with news arriving that the fleet assembling at Le Havre was being bombarded to destruction by the British, and that the French Mediterranean fleet had been defeated by the Royal Navy at Lagos Bay off the Portuguese coast, it was decided that any diversion from the main invasion in south-west England would be useful. In the last week of August, the squadron, with some 1300 infantry troops led by Brigadier General Flobert crammed in alongside the sailors, moved from the harbour at Dunkirk to stand just offshore, ready to sail at a few hours' notice. The British were most concerned with the main fleet at Brest, which they believed would now be used to invade Wales or western Scotland, but a Royal Navy squadron under Commodore William Boys was also blockading Dunkirk. On 5 September, the squadron was ordered to depart, but could not get past the blockade. This was not entirely unpleasant for François, as on 15 September his wife Henriette bore him a daughter, Cécile-Henriette, his only known child. Eventually, after a storm blew the British ships off-station, Thurot's squadron got away on 15 October and spent the next night at Ostend, dropping off a cheeky letter to the Belgian press, announcing that they were heading northward. Gale-force winds then drove the squadron rapidly northward, a fact which appeared to be confirmed by another letter published in the Brussels Gazette, dated 21 October, allegedly from aboard the Belle-Isle. Royal Navy ships had already been diverted by Boys from the Dunkirk blockade to defend the Scottish coast. The British press tried to make light of the situation:

"EPIGRAM on THUROT's Squadron.

Conflans, de la Clue, and such great Men as those,
We send Hawke and Boscawen (great Men) to oppose;
When Thurot's small Squadron this Island annoys,
We think it sufficient to send only Boys !"

==== Autumn 1759, another dwindling squadron ====
After eleven days at sea, the squadron reached Gothenburg in Sweden, and stayed 19 days to make repairs; they were also rejoined by Houmar, Thurot's partner from the previous cruise. Gossip in the port, swiftly relayed to the British government (along with complaints about the lack of a Royal Navy presence in the area) indicated that the planned destination was not Scotland but Ireland. Departing on 14 November, they again ran into foul weather, which separated them the next day, so Thurot had to put in at their prearranged rendezvous of Bergen in Norway two days later. Unfortunately, Begon, carrying 400 of the soldiers, had been damaged in the storms and driven far off course, so had to limp back to Dunkirk; the little Faucon and Houmar were also unable to rejoin the squadron. Far to the south, though, the bad weather had done some good for the French, breaking up the British blockade at Brest; the French fleet there escaped on 14 November and headed south-east to Quiberon Bay, where they would pick up troops for the invasion. On 20 November, the Royal Navy caught up with them, and in the subsequent battle, the French fleet was ruined. Now Thurot was not providing a diversion from any action at all, but he would not find that out until much later.

==== Winter 1759–60, to Carrickfergus ====
On 5 December 1759, Thurot's squadron gave up waiting for the three lost vessels and put to sea again, enduring more stormy conditions until 28 December when they were able to shelter at Westmannahavn in the Faroe Islands. By this time food was being rationed, little was available from the islanders, and the morale of the soldiers was very low, so Brigadier General Flobert proposed that the mission should be abandoned. Thurot, after displaying the written orders stating that he, not Flobert, was in command of the mission, made a counter-proposal, that supplies should be obtained by making raids on the British coast. With the weather slightly easier, the squadron sailed again on 24 January 1760 and about a week later came within sight of northern Ireland. The weather prevented a landing on the open coast, so the next day Thurot proposed a raid on Derry, in the shelter of Lough Foyle. As they were about to enter the Lough, on the following morning, yet another gale caught them, and they were driven out into the Atlantic. About 11 February the Amarante lost contact with the squadron off Barra Head in the Outer Hebrides (eventually running aground near St. Malo, scarcely seaworthy); at some point the Belle-Isle’s rudder was broken. To provide greater stability, some of the largest guns on the Belle-Isle (ten or a dozen 18-pounders) were dismounted and moved into the bottom of the hold; four of the Blonde's were thrown overboard. After mooring on 16 February in Claggain Bay, Islay, the squadron obtained desperately needed provisions, including oats and some cattle (possibly on French credit, rather than with cash—contemporary sources disagree). Here too, according to one account, Thurot was shown a news article about the defeat of the French invasion fleet. After repairs had been made, the mission resumed on 19 February, with a day looking for potential prizes in the Firth of Clyde, which brought at least one valuable success. Finally, on 21 February, the remaining troops—only about 600, because, in addition those lost on the missing ships, sickness had killed or disabled some 170 more—were landed at Kilroot near Carrickfergus in northern Ireland. Against a very small defensive force with inadequate supplies of ammunition, they took control of Carrickfergus and its old castle; during this action, Flobert was badly wounded, and had to stay ashore to recover. After demanding further provisions from Belfast, taking what they could from Carrickfergus (including any clothing they could find to protect them from the bitter winter) and preying on shipping, they embarked again, with some local dignitaries as hostages, on the night of 25–26 February before the local militia could arrive. François did manage to get one decent meal, and a night in a comfortable bed, thanks to the hospitality of a local family. Because Carrickfergus lies within Belfast Lough, they had to wait two days for a favourable wind to take them out to the open sea.

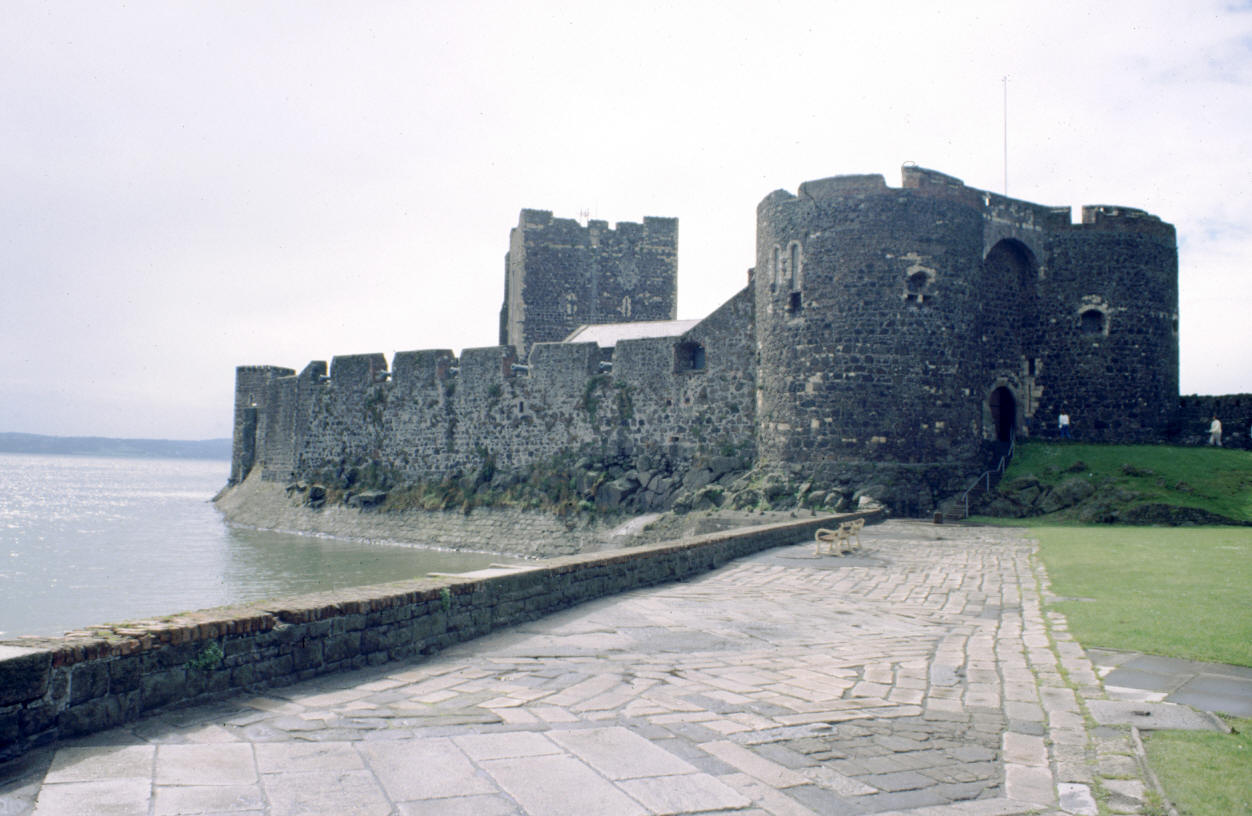
The eastern side of Carrickfergus Castle

==== 28 February 1760, the last battle ====
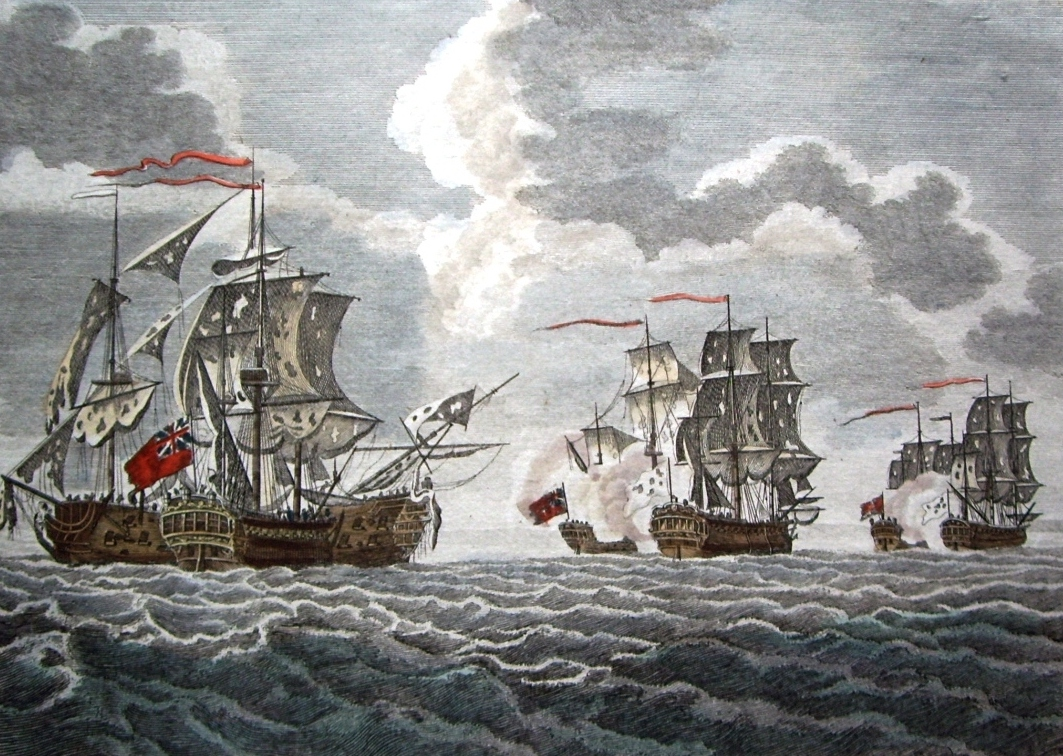
The action took place off Bishops Court between Captain Elliott and the French Captain Thurot

Three British ships caught up with Thurot's squadron on 28 February 1760, anchored at the entrance of Luce Bay. To avoid being trapped in the bay, Thurot's squadron set sail for the south-east, towards the Isle of Man. At about sunrise the leader of the British squadron, Æolus caught up with the Maréchal de Belle-Isle and battle began (within sight of the Mull of Galloway and Jurby Head on Man). After the first broadsides, Thurot tried to grapple Æolus so he could use his troops to board, but all he achieved was the loss of his bowsprit, and of many men on deck from British small-arms fire. Next Æolus fired a second broadside, and neatly fell back so that the other two Royal Navy vessels could also fire at the Belle-Isle. Then Æolus resumed the fight, while Pallas and Brilliant went to deal with the remaining French vessels, one of which, Terpsichore attempted to escape but was easily caught by Pallas. François was killed about the time of the second broadside, apparently by a musket-ball, and after a boarding party eventually got aboard, his crew surrendered. News reports claimed that aboard the Belle-Isle was found a young woman from Paddington, whom Thurot had met in London a few years previously, and had accompanied him on all his subsequent adventures—presumably the origin of the story of Miss Smith. Some 160 men had been killed aboard Belle-Isle alone, compared to four killed and eleven wounded aboard Æolus. At some point, Thurot's corpse was thrown overboard, with many others, and it washed ashore in Monreith Bay.

It was variously claimed that he was dressed in an ordinary sailor's uniform, and hence not recognised, or, on the contrary, that his corpse was found sewed up in the silk-velvet carpet from his cabin). He was buried with full honours in the churchyard of Kirkmaiden-in-Fernis, at the expense of the local laird, Sir William Maxwell Bt., of Monreith who also served as chief mourner. Within half a century, the grave marker was gone, but the site was remembered, and a new marker has since been provided. Having been so greatly feared in Britain, he was also mourned, and celebrations of his defeat paid him considerable respect. A widely circulated news report observed that "he had justly acquired, and has left behind him, the two most amiable Characteristicks of a Sailor or Soldier, intrepid Courage, and extensive Humanity", and a published letter from London reported that "most people here are sorry for his Death, as he on all Occasions behaved like a brave Officer, and a Gentleman." The artist, Richard Wright, witnessed the battle and produced paintings showing the action and the aftermath, which were both made into engravings. Ballads were written about the Carrickfergus raid and the last battle, and a biography of Thurot by the Rev. John Francis Durand was in the shops by June, in two editions priced at 1s or 6½d; sadly, despite the author's claims to have known Thurot for years, the work consisted mostly of old news stories and outright fabrications.

=== Afterword ===
In 1790, Thurot's daughter Cécile-Henriette successfully applied for a government pension, based, surprisingly, on the 1753–4 court battle with the British Customs, which had never been settled. The following year, the first true biography appeared, and, perhaps not coincidentally, debts incurred by sailors on the 1759–60 cruise were written off by the French government. François' wife Henriette died in 1797, and in 1823 Cécile-Henriette, who had married one Pierre Garnier, gave to the Town Hall of Nuits Saint-Georges a portrait of her father in the uniform of a commodore, believed to be the basis of the engraving which illustrates this article. She died in 1830.

== Principal source ==
- M *** (Nicolas-Joseph Marey) "Vie du Capitaine Thurot" Paris, Cercle Sociale, (1791) online at BNF Gallica- accessed 30 November 2007

== Further information ==
- Bailly, Camille (2000) "Lames de Sang: la vie exemplaire de François Thurot", self-published, 21220 Brochon, ISBN 2-9516111-0-2
- Picture of the 1760 sea battle in the UK National Maritime Museum- accessed 30 November 2007
