= Fifth-rate =

Historic category for Royal Navy ships

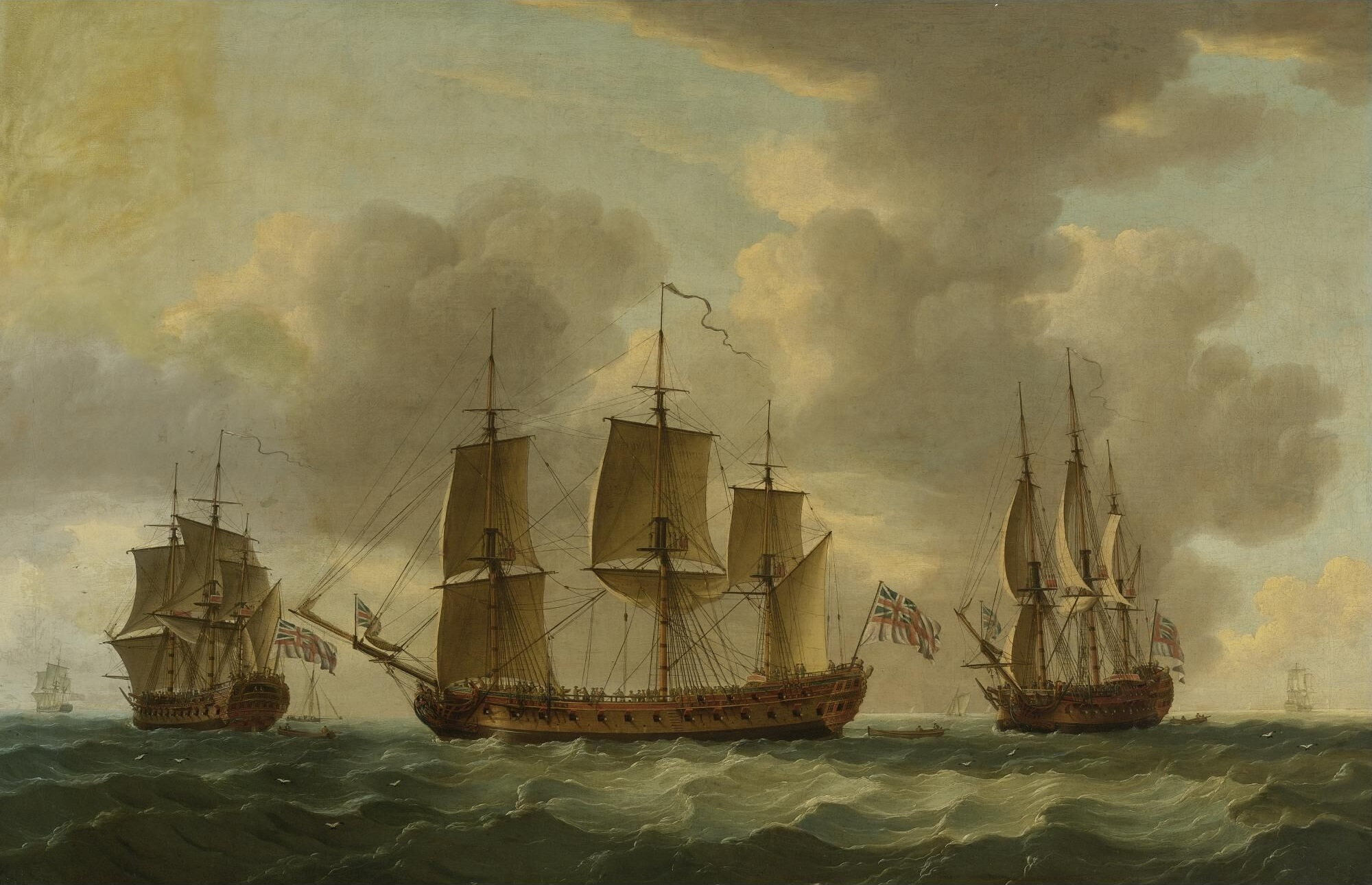
The fifth-rate HMS Pallas in three positions

In the rating system of the Royal Navy used to categorise sailing warships, a fifth-rate was the second-smallest class of warships in a hierarchical system of six "ratings" based on size and firepower.

== Rating ==
The rating system in the Royal Navy as originally devised had just four rates, but early in the reign of Charles I, the original fourth rate (derived from the "Small Ships" category under his father, James I) was divided into new classifications of fourth, fifth, and sixth rates. While a fourth-rate ship was defined as a ship of the line, fifth and the smaller sixth-rate ships were never included among ships-of-the-line. Nevertheless, during the Anglo-Dutch Wars of the 17th century, fifth rates often found themselves involved among the battle fleet in major actions. Structurally, these were two-deckers, with a complete battery on the lower deck, and fewer guns on the upper deck (below the forecastle and quarter decks, usually with no guns in the waist on this deck). Under the Establishment of 1703, fifth rates were ships that carried between 28 and 42 guns.

The fifth rates at the start of the 18th century were small two-deckers, generally either 40-gun ships with a full battery on two decks, or "demi-batterie" ships, carrying a few heavy guns on their lower deck (which often used the rest of the lower deck for row ports) and a full battery of lesser guns on the upper deck. The former were gradually phased out, though, as the low freeboard (the height of the lower deck gunport sills above the waterline) meant that opening the lower deck gunports in rough weather was often impossible. The 40-gun (or later 44-gun) fifth rates continued to be built until the latter half of the 18th century (a large number were built during the American Revolutionary War). From mid-century, a new fifth-rate type was introduced - the classic frigate, with no gun ports on the lower deck, and the main battery of from 26 to 30 guns disposed solely on the upper deck, although smaller guns were mounted on the quarterdeck and forecastle.

Fifth-rate ships served as fast scouts or independent cruisers, and included a variety of gun arrangements. The fifth rates of the 1750s generally carried a main battery of twenty-six 12-pounders on the upper deck, with six 6-pounders on the quarterdeck and forecastle (a few carried extra 6-pounders on the quarterdeck) to give a total rating of 32 guns. Larger fifth rates introduced during the late 1770s carried a main battery of twenty-six or twenty-eight 18-pounders, also with smaller guns (6-pounders or 9-pounders) on the quarterdeck and forecastle. Displacement ranged from 700 to 1450 tons, with crews of 215 to 294 men.

To be posted aboard a fifth-rate ship was considered an attractive assignment. Fifth rates were often assigned to interdict enemy shipping, offering the prospect of prize money for the crew.

Fifth-rate frigates were considered useful for their combination of manoeuvrability and firepower, which, in theory, would allow them to outmanoeuvre an enemy of greater force and run down one of lesser force. For this reason, frigates of this sort were commonly used in patrol and to disrupt enemy shipping lanes much as heavy cruisers would later in history.

== Bibliography ==
- Bennett, Geoffrey (2004). The Battle of Trafalgar. ISBN 1-84415-107-7.
- Rodger, N. A. M. (2004). The Command of the Ocean, a Naval History of Britain 1649–1815. Allen Lane. ISBN 0-7139-9411-8.
- Winfield, Rif (2009). British Warships in the Age of Sail 1603–1714: Design, Construction, Careers and Fates. Seaforth Publishing. ISBN 978-1-84832-040-6.
- Winfield, Rif (2007). British Warships in the Age of Sail 1714–1792: Design, Construction, Careers and Fates. Seaforth Publishing. ISBN 978-1-84415-700-6.
- Winfield, Rif (2008) [2005]. British Warships in the Age of Sail 1793–1817: Design, Construction, Careers and Fates (2nd, revised ed.). Seaforth. ISBN 978-1-84415-717-4.
- Winfield, Rif (2014). British Warships in the Age of Sail 1817–1863: Design, Construction, Careers and Fates. Seaforth Publishing. ISBN 978-1-84832-169-4.
