= List of ship launches in 1757 =

The list of ship launches in 1757 includes a chronological list of some ships launched in 1757.

Date	Ship	Class	Builder	Location	Country	Notes
January	Guirlande	Sixth rate	Pierre Salinoc	Brest	Kingdom of France	For French Navy.
5 February	Alderney	Alderney-class sloop	John Snooks	Saltash	Great Britain	For Royal Navy.
6 February	Achilles	Fourth rate	Barnard & Turner	Harwich	Great Britain	For Royal Navy.
7 February	Preston	Fourth rate		Deptford Dockyard	Great Britain	For Royal Navy.
February	Célèbre	Sphinx-class ship of the line	Pierre Salinoc	Brest	Kingdom of France	For French Navy.
7 March	Princess Amelia	Third rate	Thomas Fellowes	Woolwich Dockyard	Great Britain	For Royal Navy.
8 March	Rose	Seaford-class post ship	Hugh Blaydes	Hull	Great Britain	For Royal Navy.
17 March	Centaure	Hector-class ship of the line	Joseph-Marie-Blaise Coulomb	Toulon	Kingdom of France	For French Navy.
30 March	Costanza	Sixth rate	Giovanni Domenico Giacomazzi	Venice	Republic of Venice	For Venetian Navy.
7 April	Lizard	Coventry-class frigate	Henry Bird	Rotherhithe	Great Britain	For Royal Navy.
15 April	Tolleranza	Costanza-class frigate		Venice	Republic of Venice	For Venetian Navy.
25 April	Oiseau	Minerve-class frigate		Toulon	Kingdom of France	For French Navy.
April	Minotaure	Diadème-class ship of the line	Jacques-Luc Coulomb	Brest	Kingdom of France	For French Navy.
5 May	Burford	Burford-class ship of the line	John Lock	Chatham Dockyard	Great Britain	For Royal Navy.
5 May	Southampton	Southampton-class frigate	Robert Inwood	Rotherhithe	Great Britain	For Royal Navy.
6 May	Dublin	Dublin-class ship of the line		Deptford Dockyard	Great Britain	For Royal Navy.
6 May	Souverain	Souverain-class ship of the line	Noel Pommet	Toulon	Kingdom of France	For French Navy.
21 May	America	Fourth rate	Wells & Stanton	Rotherhithe	Great Britain	For Royal Navy.
24 May	Baleine	East Indiaman		Lorient	Kingdom of France	For private owners.
28 May	Vigilanza	Vigilanza-class ship of the line	Gian Paolo di Girolamo	Venice	Republic of Venice	For Venetian Navy.
30 May	Coventry	Coventry-class frigate	Henry Adams	Bucklers Hard	Great Britain	For Royal Navy.
May	Hermine	Licorne-class frigate	Jean Geoffroy	Bayonne	Kingdom of France	For French Navy.
1 June	España	Africa-class ship of the line	Matthew Mullins, Arsenal de la Carraca	Cádiz	Spain	For Spanish Navy.
1 June	San Vicenzo Ferrer	Speranza-class ship of the line		Venice	Republic of Venice	For Venetian Navy.
2 June	Pembroke	Fifth rate	Thomas Bucknall	Plymouth Dockyard	Great Britain	For Royal Navy.
17 June	Vestal	Southampton-class frigate	John Barnard and John Turner	Harwich	Great Britain	For Royal Navy.
4 July	Infernal	Infernal-class bomb vessel	Henry Bird	Northam	Great Britain	For Royal Navy.
17 July	Neptune	Second rate		Portsmouth Dockyard	Great Britain	For Royal Navy.
23 July	Hussar	Coventry-class frigate	John Lock	Chatham Dockyard	Great Britain	For Royal Navy.
29 July	Boreas	Coventry-class frigate	Israel Pownoll	Woolwich Dockyard	Great Britain	For Royal Navy.
17 August	Shannon	Coventry-class frigate	Adam Hayes	Deptford Dockyard	Great Britain	For Royal Navy.
30 August	Diana	Southampton-class frigate	Robert Batson	Limehouse	Great Britain	For Royal Navy.
30 August	Pallas	Venus-class frigate	William Wells	Deptford	Great Britain	For Royal Navy.
31 August	Glasgow	Sixth rate	John Reed	Hull	Great Britain	For Royal Navy.
15 September	Montagu	Fourth rate	Joseph Harris	Sheerness Dockyard	Great Britain	For Royal Navy.
29 September	Juno	Richmond-class frigate	William Alexander	Rotherhithe	Great Britain	For Royal Navy.
30 September	Actaeon	Coventry-class frigate	John Lock	Chatham Dockyard	Great Britain	For Royal Navy.
September	Le Chevalier de Bavo	Privateer		Bayonne	Kingdom of France	For private owner.
27 October	Brilliant	Venus-class frigate	Thomas Bucknall	Plymouth Dockyard	Great Britain	For Royal Navy.
31 October	Trent	Coventry-class frigate	William Pownall	Woolwich Dockyard	Great Britain	For Royal Navy.
12 November	Richmond	Richmond-class frigate	John Buxton	Deptford	Great Britain	For Royal Navy.
12 December	Admiral Watson	East Indiaman		Rotherhithe	Great Britain	For British East India Company.
13 December	Dorsetshire	Burford-class ship of the line	Edward Allin	Chatham Dockyard	Great Britain	For Royal Navy.
15 December	Favorite	Favorite-class sloop	Earlsman Sparrow	Shoreham-by-Sea	Great Britain	For Royal Navy.
28 December	Norfolk	Dublin-class ship of the line	Adam Hayes	Deptford Dockyard	Great Britain	For Royal Navy.
December	Pélerine	Fifth rate		Havre de Grâce	Kingdom of France	For French Navy.
Unknown date	Ebenetzer	Fourth rate			Denmark-Norway	For Dano-Norwegian Navy.
Unknown date	Essex	East Indiaman	Edward Greaves	Limehouse	Great Britain	For British East India Company.
Unknown date	Hawke	East Indiaman			Great Britain	For private owners.
Unknown date	L'Amarante	Privateer		Dieppe	Kingdom of France	For private owner.
Unknown date	Latham	East Indiaman		London	Great Britain	For British East India Company.
Unknown date	Vigilante	Schooner	Pierre Levasseur	Fort Saint-Jean	Kingdom of France	For French Navy.
Unknown date	Le Chauvelin	Privateer		Saint-Malo	Kingdom of France	For private owner.
Unknown date	Le Comte de la Rivière	Privateer		Granville	Kingdom of France	For Perrée Frères.
Unknown date	Maréchal de Richelieu	Fifth rate		Nantes	Kingdom of France	For French Navy.
Unknown date	Machault	Privateer			Kingdom of France	For private owner.
Unknown date	Maréchal de Belleisle	Fourth rate		Saint-Malo	Kingdom of France	For French Navy.
Unknown date	Merlin	Sloop of war	John Randall	Rotherhithe	Great Britain	For Royal Navy.
Unknown date	Nijenborg	East Indiaman		Hoorn	Dutch Republic	For Dutch East India Company.
Unknown date	Osterley	East Indiaman		London	Great Britain	For British East India Company.
Unknown date	Pitt	East Indiaman			Great Britain	For British East India Company.
Unknown date	San Fernando	Packet ship	Reales Astilleros de Esteiro	Ferrol	Spain	For Spanish Navy.
Unknown date	Vengeance	Privateer		Saint-Malo	Kingdom of France	For private owner.
