= HMS Liverpool (1758) =

Coventry-class Royal Navy frigate

Coordinates: 40.5902°N 73.8545°W

- Ship plan of Liverpool

History

Great Britain
- Name: HMS Liverpool
- Ordered: 3 September 1756
- Builder: John Gorill & William Pownall, Liverpool
- Laid down: 1 October 1756
- Launched: 10 February 1758
- Commissioned: February 1758
- Fate: Wrecked 1778

General characteristics
- Class & type: Coventry-class sixth-rate frigate
- Tons burthen: 589 85/94 bm
- Length: 118 ft 4 in (gundeck); 97 ft 7¼ in (keel)
- Beam: 33 ft 8½ in
- Depth of hold: 10 ft 6 in
- Sail plan: Full-rigged ship
- Complement: 200
- Armament: Upperdeck: 24 × 9-pounder guns; Quarterdeck: 4 × 3-pounder guns; 12 × swivel guns

HMS Liverpool was a 28-gun Coventry-class sixth-rate frigate of the Royal Navy. Launched in 1758, she saw active service in the Seven Years' War and the American Revolutionary War. She was wrecked in Jamaica Bay, near New York, in 1778.

== Construction ==
Liverpool was an oak-built 28-gun sixth-rate, one of 18 vessels forming part of the Coventry class of frigates. As with others in her class she was loosely modeled on the design and external dimensions of HMS Tartar, launched in 1756 and responsible for capturing five French privateers in her first twelve months at sea. The Admiralty Order to build the Coventry-class vessels was made after the outbreak of the Seven Years' War, and at a time in which the Royal Dockyards were fully engaged in constructing or fitting-out the Navy's ships of the line. Consequently, despite Navy Board misgivings about reliability and cost, contracts for all but one of Coventry-class vessels were issued to private shipyards with an emphasis on rapid completion.

Contracts for Liverpool's construction were issued on 3 September 1756 to commercial shipwrights John Gorill and William Pownall. As Gorill and Pownall's shipyard was in the city of Liverpool, Admiralty determined that this would also be the name of the vessel herself. It was stipulated that work should be completed within eleven months for a 28-gun vessel measuring approximately 590 tons burthen. Subject to satisfactory completion, Gorill and Pownall would receive a modest fee of £8.7s per ton – the lowest for any Coventry-class vessel – to be paid through periodic imprests drawn against the Navy Board. (Note: Gorill and Pownall's £8.7s fee per ton compared favourably with an average £9.0s per ton sought by Thames River shipwrights to build 24-gun Royal Navy vessels over the previous decade, and was far less than the average £9.0s per ton for all Coventry-class vessels built in private shipyards between 1756 and 1765.) Private shipyards were not subject to rigorous naval oversight, and the Admiralty therefore granted authority for "such alterations withinboard as shall be judged necessary" in order to cater for the preferences or ability of individual shipwrights, and for experimentation with internal design.

Liverpool's keel was laid down on 1 October 1756, but work proceeded slowly and the completed vessel was not ready for launch until 10 February 1758, a full six months behind schedule. As built, Liverpool was slightly longer and narrower than her sister ships in the Coventry-class, being 118 ft 4 in (36.1 m) long with a 97 ft 7 in (29.7 m) keel, a beam of 33 ft 8 in (10.26 m) and with a hold depth of 10 ft 6 in (3.2 m). Her tons burthen were measured at 589 85/94 tons.

Navy frigates were routinely fitted out and armed at Royal Dockyards, but Liverpool received her guns while still at the builder's yard. These comprised 24 nine-pounder cannons to be located along her gun deck, supported by four three-pounder cannons on the quarterdeck and twelve 1/2-pounder swivel guns ranged along her sides.

The vessel was named after the city of Liverpool in North West England. In selecting her name the Board of Admiralty continued a tradition, dating to 1644, of using geographic features; overall, ten of the nineteen Coventry-class vessels were named after well-known regions, rivers or towns. With few exceptions the remainder of the class were named after figures from classical antiquity, following a more modern trend initiated in 1748 by John Montagu, 4th Earl of Sandwich in his capacity as First Lord of the Admiralty. (Note: The exceptions to these naming conventions were Hussar, Active and the final vessel in the class, Hind)

In sailing qualities Liverpool was broadly comparable with French frigates of equivalent size, but with a shorter and sturdier hull and greater weight in her broadside guns. She was also comparatively broad-beamed which provided ample space for provisions, the ship's mess and a large magazine for powder and round shot. (Note: Liverpool's dimensional ratios 3.57:1 in length to breadth, and 3.3:1 in breadth to depth, compare with standard French equivalents of up to 3.8:1 and 3:1 respectively. Royal Navy vessels of equivalent size and design to Liverpool were capable of carrying up to 20 tons of powder and shot, compared with a standard French capacity of around 10 tons. They also carried greater stores of rigging, spars, sails and cables, but had fewer ship's boats and less space for the possessions of the crew.) Taken together, these characteristics would enable Liverpool to remain at sea for long periods without resupply. She was also built with broad and heavy masts, which balanced the weight of her hull, improved stability in rough weather and made her capable of carrying a greater quantity of sail. The disadvantages of this comparatively heavy design were a decline in manoeuvrability and slower speed when sailing in light winds.

Her designated complement was 200, comprising two commissioned officers – a captain and a lieutenant – overseeing 40 warrant and petty officers, 91 naval ratings, 38 Marines and 29 servants and other ranks. (Note: The 29 servants and other ranks provided for in the ship's complement consisted of 20 personal servants and clerical staff, four assistant carpenters an assistant sailmaker and four widow's men. Unlike naval ratings, servants and other ranks took no part in the sailing or handling of the ship.) Among these other ranks were four positions reserved for widow's men – fictitious crew members whose pay was intended to be reallocated to the families of sailors who died at sea.

== Seven Years' War ==
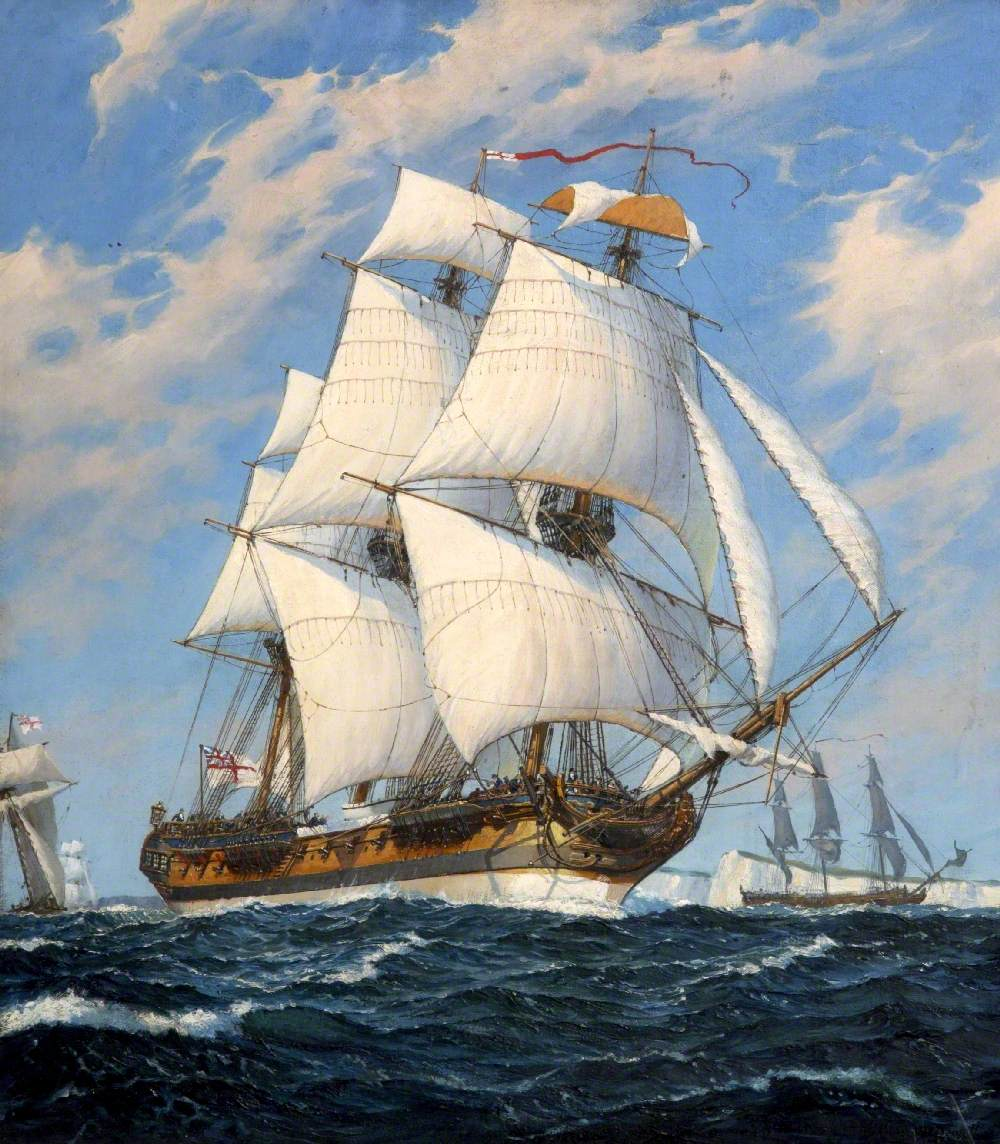
Painting of Liverpool by William McDowell

Liverpool was launched on 10 February 1758 and immediately commissioned into the Navy under the command of Captain Richard Knight. After taking on her crew, she was assigned to the Royal Navy squadron patrolling the English Channel on watch for French vessels seeking to prey on British merchant shipping. Her service began inauspiciously, with a near wreck in June. Liverpool had been outward bound from the port of Crosby, Merseyside on 28 June when she encountered heavy swell and the beginnings of a storm. Captain Knight ordered her placed at anchor fore and aft to ride out the weather close to shore. The anchors held but the rising swell began to wash over the decks and drain into the hold. It was evident that the ship would soon become so waterlogged that she would sink at anchor; Knight therefore ordered the anchor cables cut with the intention of raising sail and heading out to sea. However the storm was now so fierce that the sails would not hold and Liverpool was instead driven onto the Crosby shore. As she neared the beach she was rolled onto her side by the swell. Fearing that Liverpool would break up entirely, many of the crew abandoned their posts and swam to shore. The remainder, under Knight's orders, rushed to the deck to chop away the main and mizzen masts and allow the ship to right herself in the shallows. Returned to an even keel, Liverpool was driven up the beach to ground herself near Crosby. There she remained until the following day when she could be refloated on high tide and towed into the port for repairs.

Repaired and re-crewed, Liverpool was able to return to sea in 1759 as part of a small squadron obstructing French trade at the port of Dunkirk. On 11 May 1759 she was off Dunkirk when she encountered and captured L'Emerillon, an 8-gun French privateer. The vessel and her 52 crew were subsequently delivered to British authorities at Yarmouth. Two further victories followed, with the capture of La Nouvelle Hirondelle on 7 July and Le Glaneur on 20 November.

In March 1760 she was reassigned to convoy protection duties, between Britain and colonial outposts in the East Indies and North America. After two years she was again reassigned, as a support vessel for the Royal Navy's loose blockade of the port of Brest. In this role Liverpool was responsible for carrying messages between the blockading ships, and watching for French attempts to leave port. On 25 April 1762, while still engaged in these duties, the frigate encountered and overwhelmed Le Grand Admiral, a privateer from Bayonne. This was Richard Knight's last engagement as captain of Liverpool; in June 1762 he relinquished his command and returned to England. In Knight's absence, Liverpool secured her fifth victory at sea with the capture of French privateer Le Jacques.

Liverpool's captaincy was filled in September with the appointment of Edward Clark, formerly the first lieutenant of the 14-gun sloop HMS Fortune. War with France was drawing to a close, and by January 1763 negotiations were well advanced for the peace settlement that would be finalised in the Treaty of Paris. On 20 January 1763 Clark was ordered to sail for the East Indies with news of imminent peace. Captain Clarke committed suicide in March 1764, during Liverpool's return voyage. On reaching England, the frigate was declared surplus to the Navy's peacetime requirements, and taken to Woolwich Dockyard for decommissioning.

== Inter-war period ==
Liverpool underwent a "great repair" between March 1766 and April 1767, and was re-commissioned in March 1767. She was subsequently ordered to Newfoundland. After two years service there, she journeyed to the Mediterranean, remaining there until her eventual return for paying off in Chatham, England in March 1772.

== American Revolutionary War ==
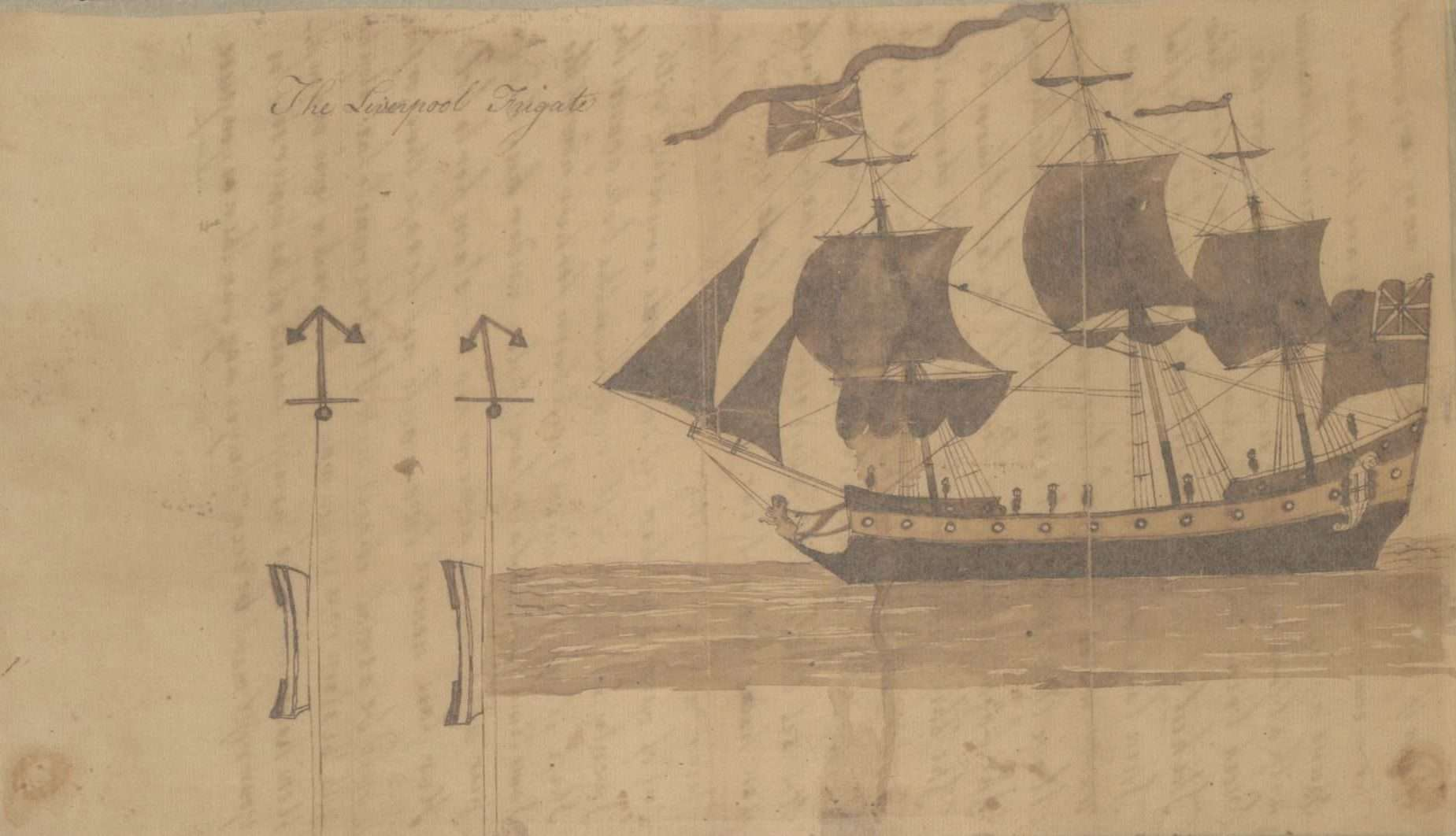
Sketch of Liverpool drawn by a Continental Army soldier in February 1776

Liverpool was re-commissioned in July 1775, shortly after the outbreak of the American Revolutionary War. Command was given to Captain Henry Bellew, with the frigate setting sail for North America on 14 September. On 1 January 1776, she participated in the bombardment of Norfolk, Virginia with John Murray, 4th Earl of Dunmore as one of three English warships in his fleet. A cannonball fired from her onboard batteries is currently still lodged in the wall of Saint Paul's Episcopal Church (Norfolk, Virginia).

On 26 August 1776 she was on patrol off Nova Scotia when she encountered two American schooners, USS Warren and USS Lynch. The American vessels fled in separate directions, with Bellew electing to follow Warren. After a short chase the American schooner was overhauled and captured; she was transformed into a ship's tender for Liverpool and her crew kept under guard until September when they were transferred to HMS Milford along with Warren's guns. (Note: Warren was retained as ship's tender for Milford until December 1776, when she was destroyed after running aground off Portsmouth, New Hampshire.)

In 1777, Liverpool was added to a fleet under the overall command of Viscount Howe and was part of the advance fleet commanded by Francis Reynolds, participating in the Battle of Red Bank on the Delaware River. On 11 February 1778, she was wrecked in Jamaica Bay, Long Island.
