= HMS Maidstone (1758) =

Coventry-class Royal Navy frigate

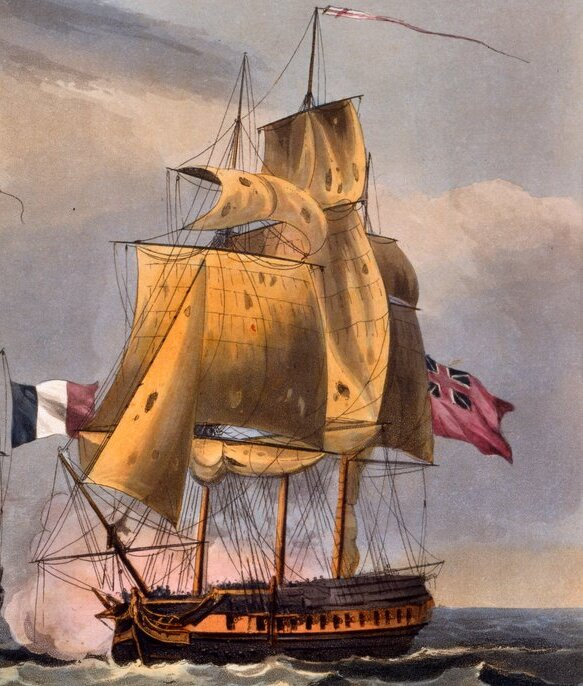
- Maidstone was built to the same design as HMS Carysfort, (pictured)

History

Great Britain
- Name: HMS Maidstone
- Namesake: Maidstone, Kent
- Ordered: 3 September 1756
- Builder: Thomas Seward, Rochester
- Laid down: 1 October 1756
- Launched: 9 February 1758
- Completed: 7 April 1758 at Chatham Dockyard
- Commissioned: January 1758
- Fate: Taken to pieces at Sheerness July 1794

General characteristics
- Class & type: 28-gun Coventry-class sixth-rate frigate
- Tons burthen: 59314/94 bm
- Length: Overall: 118 ft 4 in (36.1 m); Keel: 97 ft 5 in (29.7 m)
- Beam: 33 ft 10 in (10.3 m)
- Depth of hold: 10 ft 6 in (3.2 m)
- Sail plan: Full-rigged ship
- Complement: 200
- Armament: Upperdeck: 24 × 9-pounder guns; QD: 4 × 3-pounder guns + 12 × ½-pdr swivel guns

HMS Maidstone was a 28-gun Coventry-class sixth-rate frigate of the Royal Navy. She was launched in 1758 and taken to pieces in 1794.

== Construction ==
The vessel was named after Maidstone, a county town in Kent, England, 32 miles (51 km) south-east of London. In selecting her name the Board of Admiralty continued a tradition dating to 1644 of using geographic features for ship names; overall, ten of the nineteen Coventry-class vessels were named after well-known regions, rivers or towns. With few exceptions the remainder of the class were named after figures from classical antiquity, following a more modern trend initiated in 1748 by John Montagu, 4th Earl of Sandwich in his capacity as First Lord of the Admiralty. (Note: The exceptions to these naming conventions were Hussar, Active and the final vessel in the class, Hind)

In sailing qualities Maidstone was broadly comparable with French frigates of equivalent size, but with a shorter and sturdier hull and greater weight in her broadside guns. She was also comparatively broad-beamed with ample space for provisions and the ship's mess, and incorporating a large magazine for powder and round shot. (Note: Maidstone's dimensional ratios 3.57:1 in length to breadth, and 3.3:1 in breadth to depth, compare with standard French equivalents of up to 3.8:1 and 3:1 respectively. Royal Navy vessels of equivalent size and design to Maidstone were capable of carrying up to 20 tons of powder and shot, compared with a standard French capacity of around 10 tons. They also carried greater stores of rigging, spars, sails and cables, but had fewer ship's boats and less space for the possessions of the crew.) Taken together, these characteristics would enable Maidstone to remain at sea for long periods without resupply. She was also built with broad and heavy masts, which balanced the weight of her hull, improved stability in rough weather and made her capable of carrying a greater quantity of sail. The disadvantages of this comparatively heavy design were a decline in manoeuvrability and slower speed when sailing in light winds.

Her designated complement was 200, comprising two commissioned officers – a captain and a lieutenant – overseeing 40 warrant and petty officers, 91 naval ratings, 38 Marines, and 29 servants and other ranks. (Note: The 29 servants and other ranks provided for in the ship's complement consisted of 20 personal servants and clerical staff, four assistant carpenters an assistant sailmaker and four widow's men. Unlike naval ratings, servants and other ranks took no part in the sailing or handling of the ship.) Among these other ranks were four positions reserved for widow's men – fictitious crew members whose pay was intended to be reallocated to the families of sailors who died at sea.

== Service ==
Sometime in 1776, probably late in 1776 under the command of Alan Gardner, she captured schooner "Nancy". On 4 November, 1776 she captured brig "Yarmouth". On 10 November, she captured schooner "Polly" and sloop "Betsy". On 12 November she captured sloop "Pacificate". On 20 November she captured schooner "Marianna". She also captured on unknown date between late November and early December, 1776 sloop "Postillion". Between December, 1776 and early March, 1777 she captured on unknown dates brig "Hazard" and sloop "Reliance". On 20 April 1778 she captured Rhode Island privateer sloop Greenwich off New England. On 10 May 1778 recaptured sloop "Nancy" at (40°26′N 68°16′W). On 12 May 1778 captured, with HMS Apollo, schooner "Jack & Harry" off Nantucket. 5 June, 1778 recaptured a victualer brig off Block Island that had been captured by an American Privateer.
