= HMS Griffin (1758) =

Coventry-class Royal Navy frigate

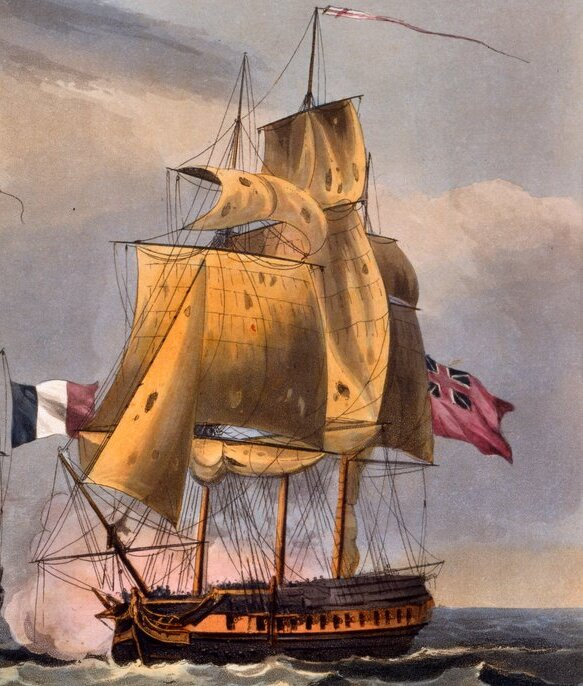
- Griffin was built to the same design as HMS Carysfort, (pictured)

History

Great Britain
- Name: HMS Griffin
- Ordered: 6 May 1757
- Builder: Moody Janverin, Bursledon
- Laid down: June 1757
- Launched: 18 October 1758
- Completed: 13 March 1759 at Portsmouth Dockyard
- Commissioned: October 1758
- Fate: Wrecked off Barbuda, 27 October 1761

General characteristics
- Class & type: 28-gun Coventry-class sixth-rate frigate
- Tons burthen: 598 52/94 bm
- Length: 118 ft 4.5 in (36.1 m) (gundeck); 97 ft 7 in (29.7 m) (keel)
- Beam: 33 ft 11.5 in (10.4 m)
- Depth of hold: 10 ft 6 in (3.20 m)
- Sail plan: Full-rigged ship
- Complement: 200 officers and men
- Armament: 28 guns comprising: Upperdeck: 24 × 9-pounder guns; Quarterdeck: 4 × 3-pounder guns; 12 × ½-pdr swivel guns

HMS Griffin was a 28-gun Coventry-class sixth-rate frigate of the Royal Navy.

== Construction ==
Griffin was an oak-built 28-gun sixth-rate, one of 18 vessels forming part of the Coventry-class of frigates. As with others in her class she was loosely modeled on the design and dimensions of HMS Tartar, launched in 1756 and responsible for capturing five French privateers in her first twelve months at sea. Admiralty contracts for Griffin's construction were issued to commercial shipwright Moody Janverin of Bursledon on 16 May 1757, with a stipulation that work be completed within twelve months. Her keel was laid down in June 1757 but work proceeded slowly and the vessel was not launched until 18 October 1758. On 26 October she was sailed to the Royal Navy dockyard at Portsmouth where she was armed and supplied for service at sea.

The vessel was named after the griffin, a legendary creature with the body, tail, and back legs of a lion, the head and wings of an eagle, and an eagle's talons as its front feet. The choice of name followed a trend initiated in 1748 by John Montagu, 4th Earl of Sandwich, in his capacity as First Lord of the Admiralty, of using figures from classical antiquity as descriptors for naval vessels. A total of six Coventry-class vessels were named in this manner; a further ten were named after geographic features including regions, English or Irish rivers, or towns. (Note: The three exceptions to these naming conventions were Hussar, Active and the final vessel in the class, Hind)

As built, Griffin was 118 ft 4.5 in (36.1 m) long with a 97 ft 7 in (29.7 m) keel, a beam of 33 ft 11 in (10.34 m), and measuring 59852/94 tons burthen. Her armament comprised 24 nine-pounder cannons located along her gun deck, supported by four three-pounder cannons on the quarterdeck and twelve 1/2-pounder swivel guns ranged along her sides. Her crewing complement was 200 officers and men. In sailing qualities she was broadly comparable with French frigates of equivalent size, but with a shorter and sturdier hull and greater weight in her broadside guns. She was also comparatively broad-beamed with ample space for provisions and the ship's mess, and incorporating a large magazine for powder and round shot. (Note: Griffin' dimensional ratios 3.57:1 in length to breadth, and 3.3:1 in breadth to depth, compare with standard French equivalents of up to 3.8:1 and 3:1 respectively. Royal Navy vessels of equivalent size and design to Griffin were capable of carrying up to 20 tons of powder and shot, compared with a standard French capacity of around 10 tons. They also carried greater stores of rigging, spars, sails and cables, but had fewer ship's boats and less space for the possessions of the crew.) Taken together, these characteristics would enable Griffin to remain at sea for long periods without resupply. She was also built with broad and heavy masts, which balanced the weight of her hull, improved stability in rough weather and made her capable of carrying a greater quantity of sail. The disadvantages of this comparatively heavy design were a decline in manoeuvrability and slower speed when sailing in light winds.

Her designated complement was 200, comprising two commissioned officers – a captain and a lieutenant – overseeing 40 warrant and petty officers, 91 naval ratings, 38 Marines and 29 servants and other ranks. (Note: The 29 servants and other ranks provided for in the ship's complement consisted of 20 personal servants and clerical staff, four assistant carpenters an assistant sailmaker and four widow's men. Unlike naval ratings, servants and other ranks took no part in the sailing or handling of the ship.) Among these other ranks were four positions reserved for widow's men – fictitious crew members whose pay was intended to be reallocated to the families of sailors who died at sea.
