= HMS Actaeon (1757) =

Coventry-class Royal Navy frigate

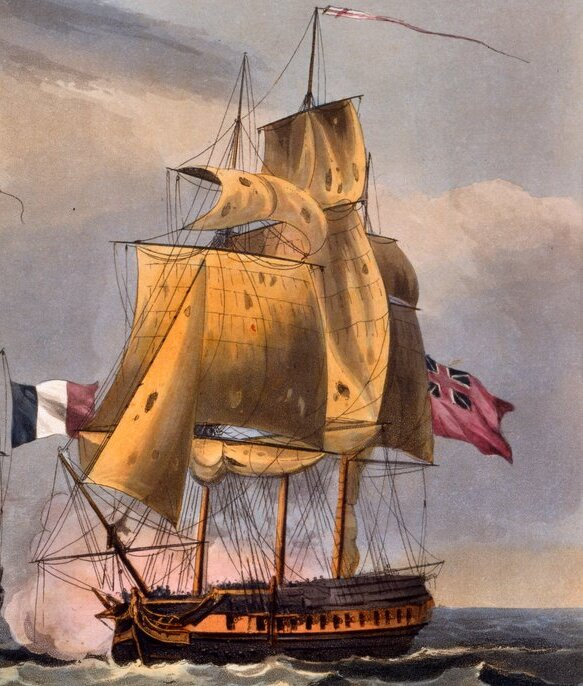
- Actaeon was built to the same design as HMS Carysfort, (pictured)

History

Great Britain
- Name: HMS Actaeon
- Ordered: 5 May 1757
- Builder: Chatham Dockyard
- Laid down: 26 May 1757
- Launched: 30 September 1757
- Completed: 9 November 1757
- Commissioned: September 1757
- Fate: Sold to be taken to pieces at Deptford 9 September 1766

General characteristics
- Class & type: 28-gun Coventry-class sixth-rate frigate
- Tons burthen: 584 81/94 bm
- Length: 118 ft 2.75 in (36.0 m) (gundeck); 97 ft 3 in (29.6 m) (keel)
- Beam: 33 ft 7.5 in (10.2 m)
- Depth of hold: 10 ft 6 in (3.20 m)
- Sail plan: Full-rigged ship
- Complement: 200
- Armament: 28 guns comprising: Upperdeck: 24 × 9-pounder guns; Quarterdeck: 4 × 3-pounder guns; 12 × 1/2-pounder swivel guns

HMS Actaeon was a 28-gun Coventry-class sixth-rate frigate of the Royal Navy. Her crewing complement was 200 and, when fully equipped, she was armed with 24 nine-pounder cannons, supported by four three-pounders and twelve 1/2-pounder swivel guns.

== Construction ==
Actaeon was designed by Sir Thomas Slade, a naval architect and newly appointed Surveyor of the Navy. Slade's plans specified construction of a 28-gun sixth rate, one of 19 vessels forming part of the Coventry class of frigates. As with others in her class she was loosely modelled on the design and dimensions of HMS Tartar, launched in 1756 and responsible for capturing five French privateers in her first twelve months at sea. The vessel was part of a second batch in the Coventry class, with design modifications including a square stern and a hull made from fir rather than oak. The use of fir was an experiment in ship design. Admiralty expected that fir-built craft would be cheaper and might also sail more swiftly in light winds. The disadvantages of fir were a propensity to rot faster than oak, and to splinter when impacted by cannon fire.

Orders from Admiralty to build the Coventry-class vessels were made after the outbreak of the Seven Years' War, and at a time in which the Royal Dockyards were fully engaged in constructing or fitting-out the Navy's ships of the line. Consequently, and despite some Navy Board misgivings, contracts for Coventry-class vessels were intended to be issued to private shipyards, with an emphasis on rapid completion of the task. However, only one offer was received, from shipwright Thomas Stanton of Rotherhithe, and Admiralty rejected his fee of £9.0 per ton burthen as being too high for a fir-built ship. (Note: Stanton's £9.0s fee was the same as the average price per ton sought by Thames River shipwrights to build oak-hulled 24-gun Royal Navy vessels over the previous decade, despite oak costing £4.5s per cartload while all other timbers ranged between £2.16s and £3.0s.) Instead, Admiralty directed the Navy Board to make room for building Actaeon at Chatham Royal Dockyard, with the work ultimately assigned to Chatham's master shipwright John Lock. The keel was laid down 26 May 1757 and work proceeded swiftly, with the vessel ready to be launched by 30 September.

== Design and crew ==
As built, Actaeon was 118 ft 2.75 in (36.0 m) long with a 97 ft 3 in (29.6 m) keel, a beam of 33 ft 7.5 in (10.249 m), and a hold depth of 10 ft 6 in (3.2 m). She was the smallest vessel in the Coventry class, measuring 584 81/94 tons burthen compared to an average of 590 tons. Construction and fit-out cost £11,228.17s, including provision of 24 nine-pounder cannons located along her gun deck, supported by four three-pounder cannons on the quarterdeck and twelve 1/2-pounder swivel guns ranged along her sides.

She was named in July 1757 after Actaeon, a hero from Greek mythology. The choice of name followed a trend initiated in 1748 by John Montagu, 4th Earl of Sandwich, in his capacity as First Lord of the Admiralty, of using figures from classical antiquity as descriptors for naval vessels. A total of six Coventry-class vessels were named in this manner; a further ten were named after geographic features including regions, English or Irish rivers, or towns. (Note: The three exceptions to these naming conventions were Hussar, Active and the final vessel in the class, Hind)

In sailing qualities Actaeon was broadly comparable with French frigates of equivalent size, but with a shorter and sturdier hull and greater weight in her broadside guns. She was also comparatively broad-beamed with ample space for provisions and the ship's mess, and incorporating a large magazine for powder and round shot. (Note: Actaeon's dimensional ratios 3.57:1 in length to breadth, and 3.3:1 in breadth to depth, compare with standard French equivalents of up to 3.8:1 and 3:1 respectively. Royal Navy vessels of equivalent size and design to Actaeon were capable of carrying up to 20 tons of powder and shot, compared with a standard French capacity of around 10 tons. They also carried greater stores of rigging, spars, sails and cables, but had fewer ship's boats and less space for the possessions of the crew.) Taken together, these characteristics would enable Actaeon to remain at sea for long periods without resupply. She was also built with broad and heavy masts, which balanced the weight of her hull, improved stability in rough weather and made her capable of carrying a greater quantity of sail. The disadvantages of this comparatively heavy design were a decline in manoeuvrability and slower speed, somewhat mitigated by the lightness of her fir-built frame.

Her designated complement was 200, comprising two commissioned officers – a captain and a lieutenant – overseeing 40 warrant and petty officers, 91 naval ratings, 38 Marines and 29 servants and other ranks. (Note: The 29 servants and other ranks provided for in the ship's complement consisted of 20 personal servants and clerical staff, four assistant carpenters an assistant sailmaker and four widow's men. Unlike naval ratings, servants and other ranks took no part in the sailing or handling of the ship.) Among these other ranks were four positions reserved for widow's men – fictitious crew members whose pay was intended to be reallocated to the families of sailors who died at sea.

== Naval career ==
=== Commissioning ===
Actaeon was commissioned in September 1757 under Captain Michael Clements. It was Clements' first independent command, though he had distinguished himself six months earlier as first lieutenant aboard HMS Unicorn, taking control of that vessel upon the death of its captain, and guiding it to victory over two French privateers. His first duties aboard Actaeon were to oversee her fitting out at Chatham Dockyard, and to gather a crew so that she could put to sea. The fitout proceeded apace and was completed by the end of the year but there were difficulties with the crew; as a new captain aboard a new vessel, Clements struggled to attract skilled seafarers as volunteers and was forced to content himself with what could be supplied by the press gang. (Note: Throughout the early to mid-eighteenth century it was commonplace for captains to recruit volunteers rather than rely on the press gang. Those with country estates tended to attract volunteers from among their own tenants, while others with good reputations as captains could attract sailors by virtue of their name. Where a Navy vessel had seen previous service it was also likely that a substantial proportion of this crew would remain with the ship and be transferred to the new captain when appointed. Having none of these advantages, Clements ultimately relied solely on the press gang.) He was disappointed with the outcome, noting in a letter to Admiralty that only twelve among Actaeon's two hundred men had sufficient experience to competently handle the sails. Discipline was also an issue; with Clements forced to publicly deny allegations that one of Actaeon's marines was visibly drunk on duty.

=== Basque Roads ===
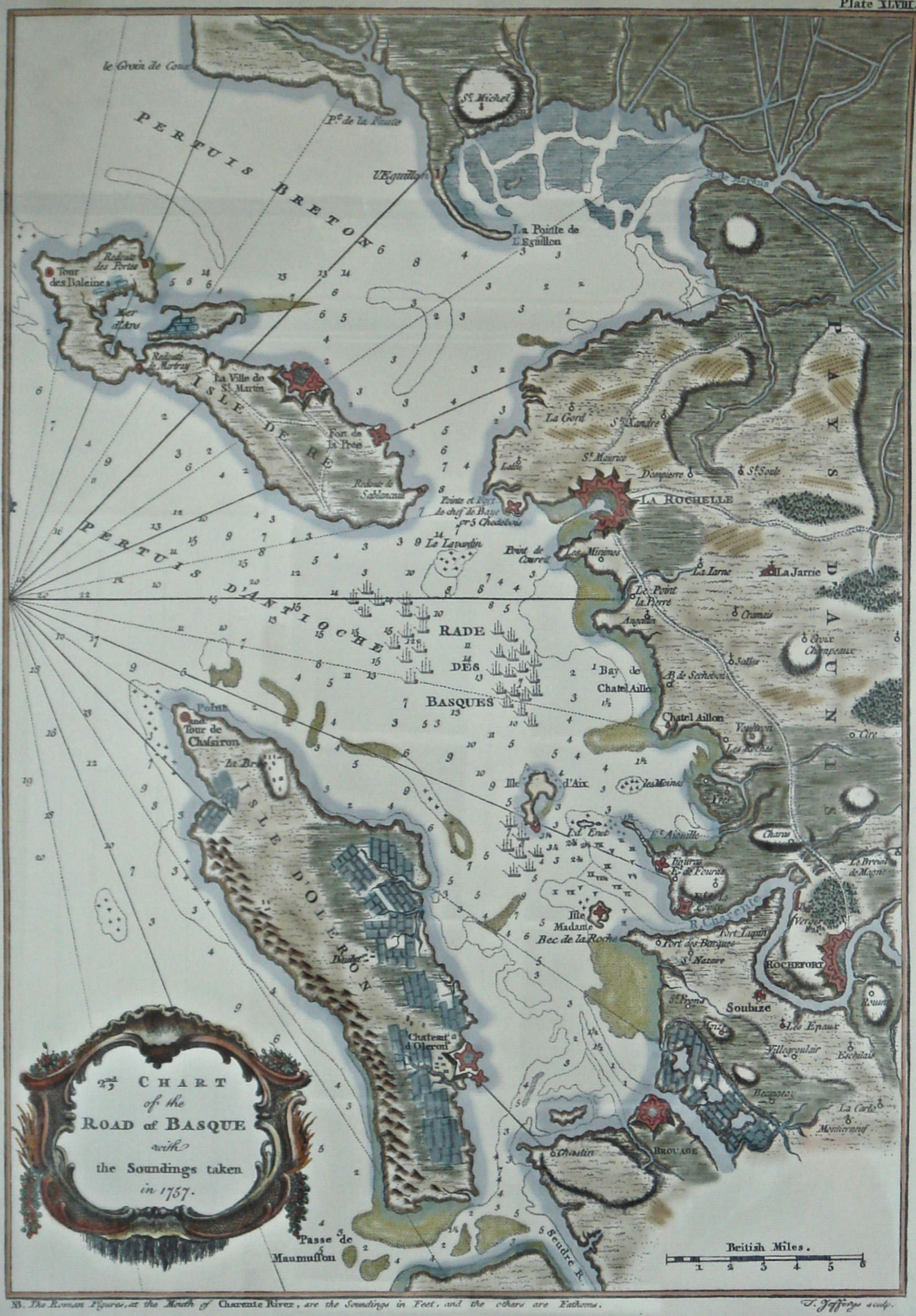
The Basque Roads off La Rochelle: scene of Actaeon's first enemy engagement in 1757

Actaeon finally put to sea in early March 1758, and was assigned to protect a flotilla of British troopships en route to Senegal as part of a British expedition to seize France's African possessions. In late March, she was reassigned to a ten-vessel squadron under Admiral Edward Hawke, which was hunting French merchant convoys near the port of Rochefort. One such convoy was sighted near the Île de Ré on 4 April but escaped before the British could draw near. However, later that day a second convoy was discovered in the nearby Basque Roads, comprising seven French naval vessels and forty merchant craft. Hawke ordered his squadron to engage but the water was too shallow for any of his ships to draw near; for their part the French made sail to flee towards the port of La Rochelle. In their haste, a number of the French vessels ran aground and could only be refloated after their crews had thrown their guns and stores overboard. The French marked the locations of this discarded equipment with buoys, but these were removed by Actaeon's crew. Around 80 buoys were destroyed before the ebbing tide forced the British boats away from the shore.

The destruction of the buoys represented Actaeon's only engagement of the expedition; but the loss of this large quantity of equipment represented a setback to the French war effort. Hawke subsequently returned to England, leaving Actaeon and five other vessels from the squadron to hold position outside the Basque Roads. While on this station, Clements observed that the routine business of cleaning of Actaeon's fir-built hull had left the planking "extremely ragged" despite only one year at sea.

=== Blockade duty ===
Actaeon finally departed the Basque Roads in June 1758, joining a squadron of 22 ships of the line, under Admiral George Anson, which was loosely blockading the port of Brest. The French fleet at Brest remained in port, and Acateon was able to roam along the coastline in search of privateers. In mid-July she secured her first enemy capture when, in company with the 64-gun Alcide, she forced the surrender of the 24-gun French privateer Le Robuste. Elements of Anson's squadron returned to Plymouth by 19 July, with Actaeon remaining off Brest with a smaller flotilla under Admiral Charles Saunders.

On 23 November she was close to the shore when her crew sighted a French fleet comprising five ships of the line, five frigates and around sixty merchant vessels, attempting to escape the blockade. Captain Clements sent word to alert the rest of the British flotilla, but the French vessels passed out of sight before the message was delivered. As officer in charge, Admiral Saunders gave orders for a general chase in the direction the French had gone, but there was no sign. During the chase Clements mistakenly signaled pursuit of a distant group of ships, which proved on close inspection to be from unaligned Spain.

The British squadron was returning to Brest when Saunders received intelligence reports that the 36-gun French frigate Felicite and a 24-gun fluyt Robuste had sailed from Bordeaux. Actaeon and her sister ship Alcide were sent in pursuit, encountering the French vessels near Cape Finisterre on 15 September. The French frigate escaped under cover of darkness, but the fluyt's crew surrendered in the face of superior firepower and were captured along with their cargo of 3000 artillery shells and substantial supplies of cordage, canvas and flour. Actaeon and Alcide returned to Brest with their prize, but the blockade of that port was subsequently abandoned as several British ships were in need of repair. Actaeon therefore returned to England in company with the squadron, making port in December 1758.

In early 1759 command of the frigate passed to Captain Maximilian Jacobs, and in November to Captain Paul Ourry. Actaeon was then joined to a squadron under the overall command of Admiral George Rodney, stationed in the English Channel. On 8 November, Actaeon succeeded in capturing two more prizes; the 12-gun privateer Le Phoenix in November, and the privateer La Grivois a month later.
