= HMS Shannon (1757) =

Coventry-class Royal Navy frigate

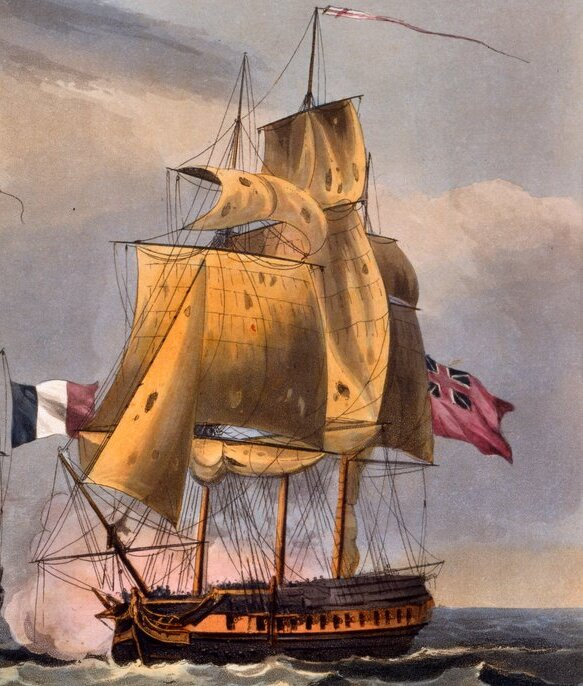
- Shannon was built to the same design as HMS Carysfort, (pictured)

History

Great Britain
- Name: HMS Shannon
- Ordered: 18 April 1757
- Builder: Deptford Dockyard
- Laid down: 11 May 1757
- Launched: 17 August 1757
- Completed: 8 October 1757
- Commissioned: August 1757
- Fate: Taken to pieces at Portsmouth December 1765

General characteristics
- Class & type: 28-gun Coventry-class sixth-rate frigate
- Tons burthen: 587 53/94 bm
- Length: 118 ft 6 in (36.1 m) (gundeck); 97 ft 5.5 in (29.7 m) (keel)
- Beam: 33 ft 8 in (10.3 m)
- Depth of hold: 10 ft 6 in (3.20 m)
- Sail plan: Full-rigged ship
- Complement: 200 officers and men
- Armament: 28 guns comprising: Upperdeck: 24 × 9-pounder guns; Quarterdeck: 4 × 3-pounder guns; 12 × ½-pdr swivel guns

HMS Shannon was a 28-gun Coventry-class sixth-rate frigate of the Royal Navy.

== Construction ==
Shannon was one of five frigates of the class built of fir rather than oak. Fir was cheaper and more abundant than oak and permitted noticeably faster construction, but at a cost of a reduced lifespan; the four fir-built Coventry-class vessels that did not get captured lasted an average of only nine years before being struck off.

The vessel was named after the River Shannon in Ireland. In selecting her name the Board of Admiralty continued a tradition dating to 1644, of using geographic features for ship names; overall, ten of the nineteen Coventry-class vessels were named after well-known regions, rivers or towns. With few exceptions the remainder of the class were named after figures from classical antiquity, following a more modern trend initiated in 1748 by John Montagu, 4th Earl of Sandwich in his capacity as First Lord of the Admiralty. (Note: The exceptions to these naming conventions were Hussar, Active and the final vessel in the class, Hind. It is worthwhile explaining that for early ships whose names were seemingly geographical, the ship was not named after the geographical location itself but were to honour the titled person whose title included that location, e.g. the name Sandwich was not given to a ship because of the town of Sandwich, but to honour the Earl of Sandwich. Similarly the name Norfolk was not awarded in respect of the county of that name, but to honour the Duke of Norfolk. This process applied to virtually all geographical location names awarded in the 17th or early 18th century.)

In sailing qualities Shannon was broadly comparable with French frigates of equivalent size, but with a shorter and sturdier hull and greater weight in her broadside guns. She was also comparatively broad-beamed with ample space for provisions and the ship's mess, and incorporating a large magazine for powder and round shot. (Note: Shannon's dimensional ratios 3.57:1 in length to breadth, and 3.3:1 in breadth to depth, compare with standard French equivalents of up to 3.8:1 and 3:1 respectively. Royal Navy vessels of equivalent size and design to Shannon were capable of carrying up to 20 tons of powder and shot, compared with a standard French capacity of around 10 tons. They also carried greater stores of rigging, spars, sails and cables, but had fewer ship's boats and less space for the possessions of the crew.) Taken together, these characteristics would enable Shannon to remain at sea for long periods without resupply. She was also built with broad and heavy masts, which balanced the weight of her hull, improved stability in rough weather and made her capable of carrying a greater quantity of sail. The disadvantages of this comparatively heavy design were a decline in manoeuvrability and slower speed when sailing in light winds.

Her designated complement was 200, comprising two commissioned officers – a captain and a lieutenant – overseeing 40 warrant and petty officers, 91 naval ratings, 38 Marines and 29 servants and other ranks. (Note: The 29 servants and other ranks provided for in the ship's complement consisted of 20 personal servants and clerical staff, four assistant carpenters an assistant sailmaker and four widow's men. Unlike naval ratings, servants and other ranks took no part in the sailing or handling of the ship.) Among these other ranks were four positions reserved for widow's men – fictitious crew members whose pay was intended to be reallocated to the families of sailors who died at sea.
