= HMS Boreas (1757) =

Coventry-class Royal Navy frigate

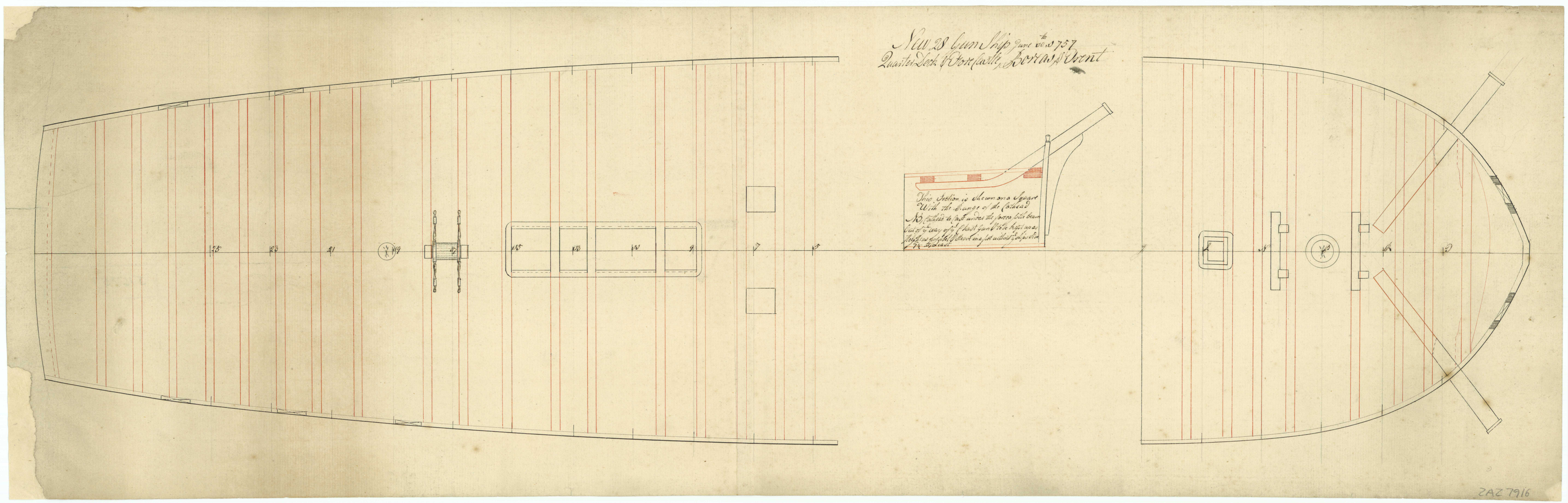
- Plan showing the quarterdeck, forecastle, and section of the cathead for Boreas, a fir-built 28-gun Frigate built at Woolwich Dockyard

History

Great Britain
- Name: HMS Boreas
- Ordered: 18 April 1757
- Builder: Woolwich Dockyard
- Laid down: 21 April 1757
- Launched: 29 July 1757
- Completed: 6 September 1757
- Commissioned: August 1757
- Fate: Sold on 29 June 1770

General characteristics
- Class & type: Coventry-class sixth-rate frigate
- Tons burthen: 587 30/94 bm
- Length: 118 ft 5 1/2 in (36.1 m) (gundeck); 97 ft 5 in (29.7 m) (keel)
- Beam: 33 ft 8 in (10.3 m)
- Depth of hold: 10 ft 6 in (3.20 m)
- Sail plan: Full-rigged ship
- Complement: 200
- Armament: Upper deck: 24 × 9-pounder guns; QD: 4 × 3-pounder guns; 12 × 1/2-pounder swivel guns

HMS Boreas was a 28-gun Coventry-class sixth-rate frigate of the Royal Navy. Built by Israel Pownoll at Woolwich Dockyard and launched in 1757, she was one of five frigates of the class built of fir rather than oak. Boreas saw service during the Seven Years' War and took part in two actions at sea. She assisted in the capture of the 36-gun French frigate Diane in April 1758, and her most famous engagement was the capture of the French frigate Sirène in October 1760. She was sold out of the service in 1770.

== Construction and commissioning ==
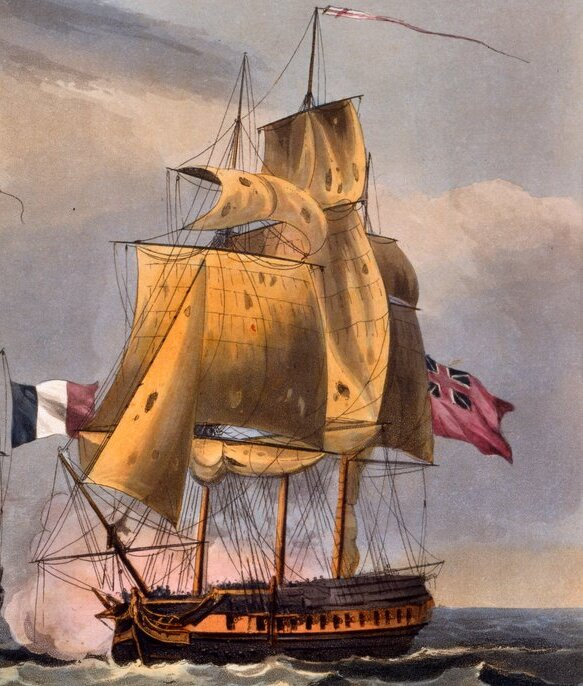
Boreas was built to the same design as HMS Carysfort, (pictured)

Boreas was ordered on 18 April 1757 and laid down on 21 April that year at the Admiralty yards at Woolwich Dockyard. She was launched on 29 July 1757 and completed by 6 September 1757. She initially cost £6,314.9.10d, this rising to £9,193.18.3d when the cost of fitting her out was included. She was one of five frigates of the class experimentally built using fir rather than oak. Fir was cheaper and more abundant than oak and permitted noticeably faster construction, but at a cost of a reduced lifespan; the fir-built Coventry-class vessels lasted an average of eight years, three times less than their oak-built equivalents. The fir-built ships also required greater maintenance after periods at sea, averaging £1,573 in repairs for each year of service compared with £1,261 for comparable vessels built from oak.

The frigate was named after Boreas, the Greek god of the north wind and bringer of winter. The naming followed a trend initiated in 1748 by John Montagu, 4th Earl of Sandwich, in his capacity as First Lord of the Admiralty, of using figures from classical antiquity as descriptors for naval vessels. A total of six Coventry-class vessels were named in this manner; a further ten were named after geographic features including regions, English or Irish rivers, or towns. (Note: The exceptions to these naming conventions were Hussar, Active and the final vessel in the class, Hind)

In sailing qualities Boreas was broadly comparable with French frigates of equivalent size, but with a shorter and sturdier hull and greater weight in her broadside guns. She was also comparatively broad-beamed with ample space for provisions and the ship's mess, and incorporating a large magazine for powder and round shot. (Note: Boreas' dimensional ratios 3.57:1 in length to breadth, and 3.3:1 in breadth to depth, compare with standard French equivalents of up to 3.8:1 and 3:1 respectively. Royal Navy vessels of equivalent size and design to Boreas were capable of carrying up to 20 tons of powder and shot, compared with a standard French capacity of around 10 tons. They also carried greater stores of rigging, spars, sails and cables, but had fewer ship's boats and less space for the possessions of the crew.) Taken together, these characteristics would enable Boreas to remain at sea for long periods without resupply. She was also built with broad and heavy masts, which balanced the weight of her hull, improved stability in rough weather and made her capable of carrying a greater quantity of sail. The disadvantages of this comparatively heavy design were a decline in manoeuvrability and slower speed when sailing in light winds.

Her designated complement was 200, comprising two commissioned officers – a captain and a lieutenant – overseeing 40 warrant and petty officers, 91 naval ratings, 38 Marines and 29 servants and other ranks. (Note: The 29 servants and other ranks provided for in the ship's complement consisted of 20 personal servants and clerical staff, four assistant carpenters an assistant sailmaker and four widow's men. Unlike naval ratings, servants and other ranks took no part in the sailing or handling of the ship.) Among these other ranks were four positions reserved for widow's men – fictitious crew members whose pay was intended to be reallocated to the families of sailors who died at sea.

== Career ==
Boreas was commissioned in August 1757 under the command of 21 year-old post-captain Robert Boyle, the youngest surviving son of Henry Boyle, 1st Earl of Shannon. Boyle was an experienced seaman, having joined the Navy at age twelve; however Boreas was to be his first major command.

Rigging and fitout for the vessel were completed by September and under Boyle's supervision she was sailed to Portsmouth to take on her guns. Flaws in her fir hull had become apparent even at this early stage; in December 1757 Captain Boyle advised Admiralty that planking adjacent to the hatchways was cracked and worn, as were the strakes along the hull. Boyle unsuccessfully recommended that the hatchway timbers and the hull be re-covered with elm before the vessel was declared seaworthy. He also observed that the aft hatchway had been constructed directly above the entrance to the magazine, which "may be of fatal consequence in time of action." In addition the bulwarks on the main deck were too low, with the crew likely to be exposed to enemy fire should Boreas run alongside an enemy ship.

Boyle's concerns went unheeded, and Boreas was put to sea in early 1758. In April she assisted in the capture of the 36-gun French frigate Diane. Boyle then sailed her to America on 21 June 1758 and she was subsequently involved in the operations off Louisbourg that year. Boreas shared in the proceeds of the capture of the merchantman Foudroyant and the schooner Two Brothers, captured off Louisbourg. She also shared in the proceeds of the taking of the Bienfaisant and Echo, and the proceeds from the burning, sinking, or destroying the French warships Prudent, Entreprennante, Celebre, Capricieux, Apollon, and Fidelie in the harbour of Louisbourg, as well as the sundry naval stores, the recapture of the snow Muscliff, the sloop Dolphin, and the prize sloop Sellerie. In November 1762 Boreas was paid head money for the privateers Bayonese and Leon, captured while she was under Boyle's command.

A period of service in the English Channel with Admiral George Rodney's squadron followed in 1759. On 28 March Boreas captured the Demoiselle, which was coming from San Domingo. Later, Boreas took part in the bombardment of Le Havre on 3 July that year. At some point Boreas also recaptured Hazard's Bounty.

She came under the command of Captain Samuel Uvedale in February 1760, and he sailed her to Jamaica on 26 March. On 30 August that year he chased the privateer St Michel ashore near Cape St Nicholas Mole and burnt her. While under Uvedale's command, Boreas captured the privateer ships Intrepid and Dragon.

Another action occurred on 18 October when Admiral Charles Holmes in Hampshire (50 guns) took Boreas and Lively (20 guns) to intercept a French convoy in the Windward Passage. After sighting the five French vessels on the morning of 17 October, the British gave chase. Light winds slowed the chase so it was evening before Boreas could engage the 32-gun frigate Sirène. French fire disabled Boreas aloft with the result that Boreas could not engage Sirène again until the following afternoon. (Note: Sirène was armed with twenty-six 8-pounder guns on the gun deck and four 6-pounder guns on the quarterdeck. She had been built by Jacques-Luc Coulomb at Brest in 1744.) Boreas emerged victorious from the engagement, capturing Sirène, which suffered about 80 men killed and wounded, most of whom died later; Boreas lost only one man killed and one wounded. The French 20-gun corvette Valeur, struck to Lively. Hampshire chased the merchant frigate Prince Edward on shore where her crew set fire to her, leading her to blow up. Cambridge, Boreas, Hussar, and Viper, shared by agreement in the prize money for Sirene, Valeur, the snow Maria, the sloop Elizabeth, and the sloop Pursue.

On 19 October, Hampshire, with Lively and Valeur, cornered the King's frigate Fleur de Lis in Freshwater Bay, a little to leeward of Port-de-Paix; her crew too set her on fire. The merchant frigate Duc de Choiseul, of 32 guns and 180 men under the command of Captain Bellevan, escaped into Port-de-Paix.

In late 1760, boats under the command of Lieutenant Millar, first lieutenant of Trent and Lieutenant Stuart, first lieutenant of Boreas, cut out the privateers Vainquer and Mackau from Cumberland Harbour, Cuba. The French were forced to burn another, Guespe, to prevent her capture. Trent lost three men killed and one man wounded and one man missing, and Boreas lost one man killed and five men wounded; French casualties are unknown. All the casualties occurred in taking Vainquer as Mackau did not resist. Boreas also lost her barge, sunk in the boarding. Vainquer was armed with 10 guns, 16 swivels, and 90 men; Mackau had 6 swivels and 15 men; Guespe had 8 guns and 86 men. In April, Boreas was paid for the capture of the Vrouw Jacoba, and the brigantine Leon.

Boreas then returned to Jamaica to undergo repairs, which lasted into 1761. Boreas went on to capture the privateer Belle-Madeleine on 18 December 1761. Then from 6 June until 13 August 1762, she took part in the capture of Havana. After this, she returned to Britain as a convoy escort along with Centurion and Viper, and was surveyed at Woolwich.

A small repair followed, lasting until May 1763. Captain Richard Hughes took over command in April 1763, serving off North Foreland until 1766. Captain Constantine Phipps succeed him in 1767, and was himself replaced by Captain Digby Dent the following year. Both commanded Boreas in the Channel.

== Fate ==
Boreas was surveyed for a final time on 23 May 1770. She was sold a month later on 29 June for the sum of £280.
