= Battle of Cumberland Bay =

1760 naval battle of the Seven Years' War

- Part of the Seven Years' War
| Date | November 1760 |
| Location | Guantánamo Bay, Spanish Cuba |
| Result | British victory |

Belligerents
| Great Britain | France |

Commanders and leaders
| (Kingdom of Great Britain) Samuel Uvedale | Unknown |

Strength
| 2 Frigates | 3 Privateers |

Casualties and losses
| 4 killed 7 wounded | 2 Privateers captured 1 Privateer burned |

The Battle of Cumberland Bay was a minor naval engagement which took place off the Spanish island of Cuba during the Seven Years war in November 1760. The action was between two Royal Navy ships and three French privateers. The engagement was a cutting out operation Guantánamo Bay in which the British were victorious - three French privateers were sunk captured or burned.

== Events ==
Background

In late 1760, the 28 gun Frigate HMS Trent was operating off the Spanish island of Cuba and keeping an eye for known French privateers which was using the island as a base to launch attacks against British shipping. Trent was joined by HMS Boreas.

The French privateers Vainquer and Mackau, which were hiding in the bay. The Spanish although not at war with Great Britain turned a blind eye to complaints regarding the use of their harbours for French privateers.

Cutting out operation

Vainqueur of ten-guns, sixteen swivels, and ninety men, and the Mackau of six swivels, and fifteen men, had run into shoal water in Cumberland harbour.

Boats under the command of Lieutenant Millar, first lieutenant of Trent and Lieutenant Stuart, first lieutenant of Boreas, rowed up to the Vainqueur. They boarded the French privateer and after a brief fight took possession of her.

The Mackau was taken without difficulties any resistance: then the boats proceeded against the Guespe, of eight guns, and eighty five men, which laid at anchor further up in the Lagoon; but before they, came up the French had set her on fire, and she was destroyed.

Aftermath

Trent lost three men killed and one man wounded and one man missing, and Boreas lost one man killed and five men wounded; French casualties are unknown. As the casualties occurred in taking Vainquer as Mackau did not resist. Boreas also lost her barge, sunk in the boarding. Vainquer was armed with 10 guns, 16 swivels, and 90 men; Mackau had 6 swivels and 15 men; Guespe had 8 guns and 86 men.

The Royal Navy had a successful cruise against French privateers, eight of which were destroyed or brought into Jamaica.

== See also ==
- Cutting out of the Hermione
