= Petty cash =

Funds in the form of cash

Petty cash is a small amount of discretionary funds in the form of cash used for minor expenditures.

The most common way of accounting for petty cash expenditures is to use the imprest system. The initial fund would then be created by issuing a check for the desired amount in which the bookkeeping entry would be to debit petty cash and credit bank account. This check would then be cashed to acquire the actual cash needed for payments.

As expenditures are made, the custodian of the fund (a bookkeeper or a member of the administration staff) will reimburse employees and receive a petty cash voucher with a receipt/invoice attached in return. At any given time, the total of cash on hand plus reimbursed vouchers must equal the original fund for petty cash.

When the fund gets low, e.g. $20 remaining, the custodian requests a top up and submits the vouchers for reimbursement. Assuming the vouchers add up to $80, an $80 top up check is issued and an $80 debit towards office expenses is recorded. Once the check is cashed, the organization again has cash at the original amount of $100.

== Audit controls ==
Oversight of petty cash is important because of the potential for abuse. Examples of petty cash controls include a limit on disbursements and monthly audits by someone other than the custodian.

The petty cash daybook is one of the daybooks used in bookkeeping and the double-entry bookkeeping system.
