= HMS Guadeloupe (1763) =

Coventry-class Royal Navy frigate

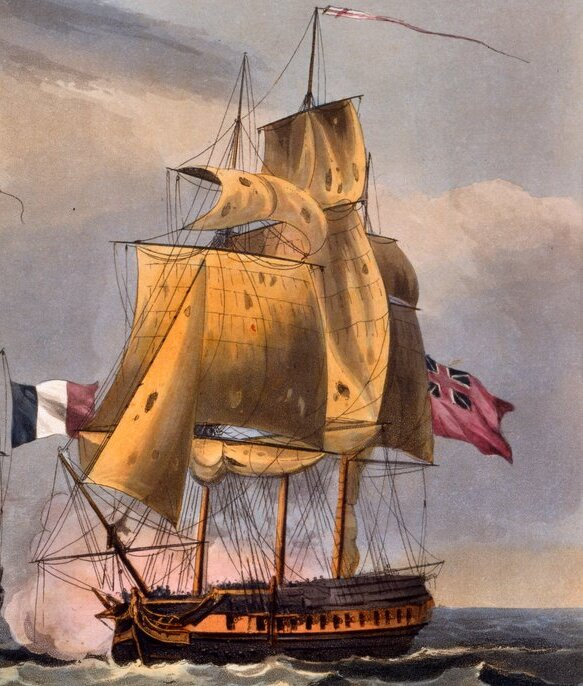
- Guadeloupe was built to the same design as HMS Carysfort, (pictured)

History

Great Britain
- Name: HMS Guadeloupe
- Namesake: Invasion of Guadeloupe (1759)
- Ordered: 19 September 1757 (Williams); 29 June 1758 (Plymouth)
- Builder: John Williams, Neyland, Pembrokeshire (initially); Plymouth Dockyard
- Laid down: 8 May 1759
- Launched: 5 December 1763
- Completed: 11 July 1764
- Commissioned: March 1764
- Out of service: Scuttled on 10 October 1781

France
- Name: Guadeloupe
- Acquired: Salvaged
- Commissioned: April 1783
- Fate: Deleted from navy list in 1786

General characteristics
- Class & type: Coventry-class sixth-rate frigate
- Displacement: 850 tons (French)
- Tons burthen: 586 30/94 (bm)
- Length: 118 ft 4 in (36.1 m) (gundeck); 97 ft 3 1/2 in (29.7 m) (keel)
- Beam: 33 ft 8 in (10.3 m)
- Depth of hold: 10 ft 6 in (3.20 m)
- Sail plan: Full-rigged ship
- Complement: British service: 200; French service: 130 (peace) and 210 (war)
- Armament: British service: Upper deck: 24 × 9-pounder guns; QD: 4 × 3-pounder guns; Also: 12 × 1/2-pdr swivel guns; French service: Upper deck: 20 × 8-pounder guns; Spardeck: 4 × 4-pounder guns

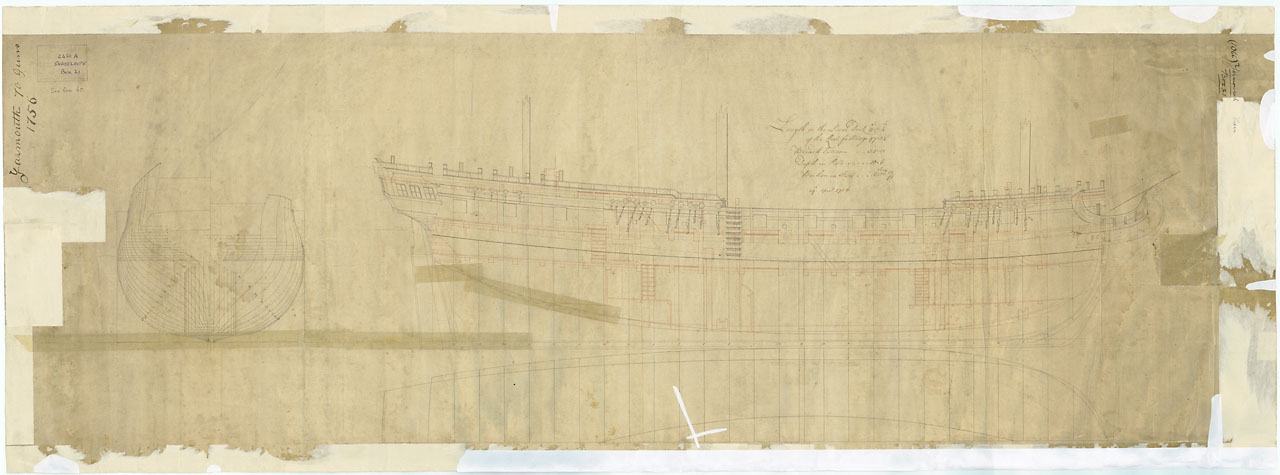
Plan of Guadeloupe in 1763

HMS Guadeloupe (or Guadaloupe), was a 28-gun sixth-rate Coventry-class frigate of the Royal Navy. The ship was designed by Sir Thomas Slade, and was initially contracted to be built with the Pembrokeshire shipwright John Williams of Neyland; however he became bankrupt and the Admiralty transferred the order to the Plymouth Naval Dockyard.

Guadeloupe served during the American War of Independence. In May 1778 she was under the command of Captain Hugh Robinson. At Yorktown her men, stores, and guns were landed to support the British Army during the siege. When she came under fire from shore batteries the British scuttled her in the York River, Virginia, on 10 October 1781 to prevent the French capturing her.

The French Navy subsequently salvaged her and then commissioned her in April 1783 after extensive repairs. She was sailed to Brest. She was ordered on 8 July 1786 at Rochefort to be decommissioned and delisted.
