= Coventry-class frigate =

Class of frigates in the Royal Navy

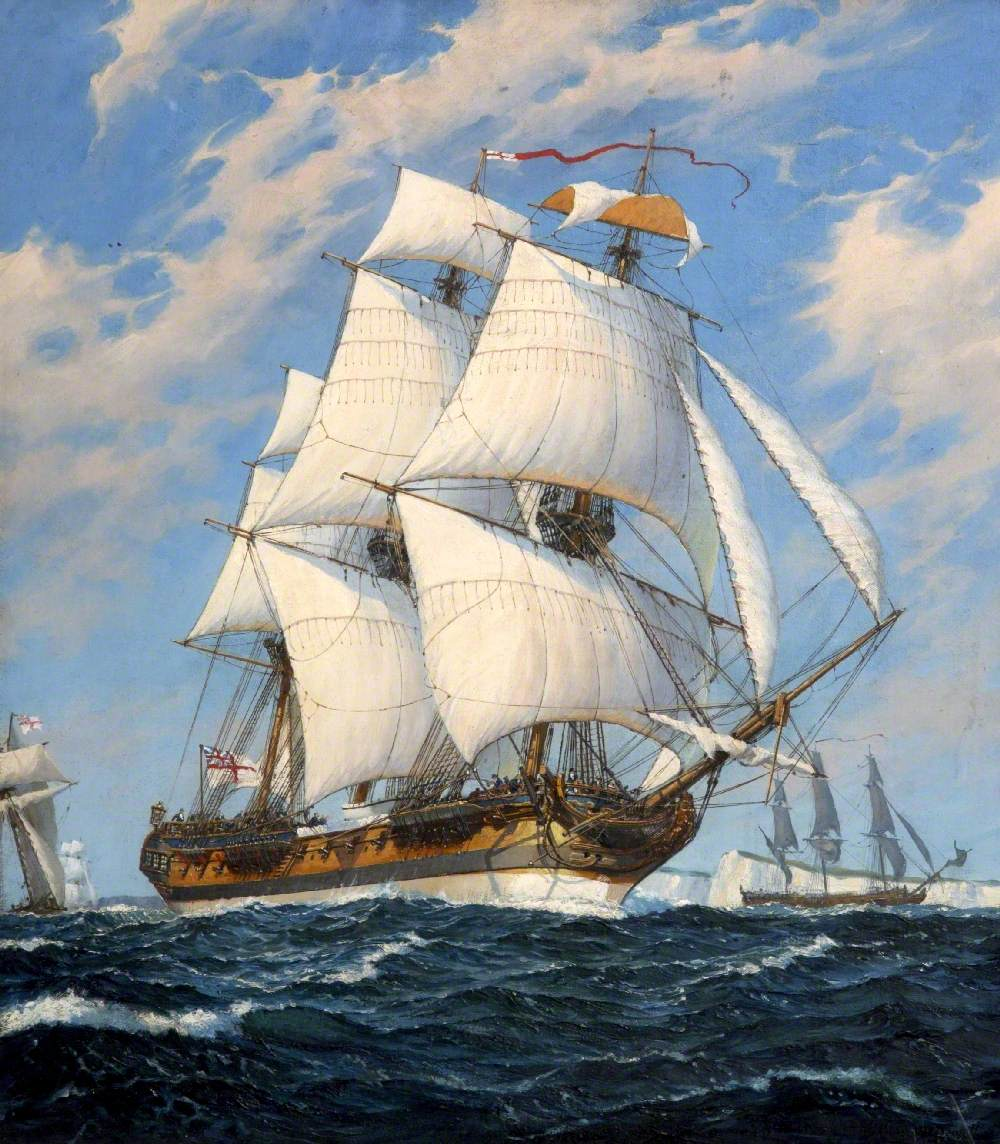
- The Coventry-class frigate HMS Liverpool

Class overview
- Name: Coventry class
- Operators: Royal Navy
- Built: 1756–1787
- In commission: 1787–1828
- Planned: 20
- Completed: 19
- Canceled: 1
- Lost: 6

General characteristics
- Class & type: Frigate
- Tons burthen: 587 30/94 bm
- Length: 118 ft 4 in (36.07 m)
- Beam: 33 ft 8 in (10.26 m)
- Depth of hold: 10 ft 6 in (3.20 m)
- Sail plan: Full-rigged ship
- Complement: 200
- Armament: As built : UD: 24 × 9-pounder guns; QD: 4 × 3-pounder guns; FC: nil; From 1780 : UD: 24 × 9-pounder guns; QD: 4 × 6-pounder guns and 18-pounder carronades; FC: 2 × 18-pounder carronades

The Coventry-class frigates were 28-gun sixth rate frigates of the Royal Navy, principally in service during the Seven Years' War and the American Revolutionary War. They were designed in 1756 by Britain's Surveyor of the Navy, Sir Thomas Slade, and were largely modeled on HMS Tartar, which was regarded as an exemplar among small frigates due to its speed and maneuverability. The 1750s were a period of considerable experimentation in ship design, and Slade authorized individual builders to make "such alterations withinboard as may be judged necessary" in final construction.

A total of twelve Coventry-class frigates were built in oak during the Seven Years' War. Eleven of these were ordered from private shipyards and built over the relatively short period of three years; the twelfth was completed following the close of the War in a royal dockyard after its original contractor became bankrupt.

The five vessels in the second batch were built fir hulls rather than oak. The use of fir instead of oak increased the speed of construction but reduced the frigate's durability over time. This batch also differed in external appearance to the oak-built frigates, as they had a square tuck stern. The third and fourth batches returned to oak frames.

More than a quarter-century after the design was produced, two further oak-built ships to this design were ordered to be built by contract in October 1782. One of these was cancelled a year later, when the builder became bankrupt.

== Ships ==
=== First batch ===
Ship	Builder	Price and contract rate	Naval fitout	Laid down	Launched	Commissioned	Out of service	Fate	Ref.
Coventry	Henry Adams, Buckler's Hard	£5,130 at £8.15s per ton	£3,977	May 1756	May 1757	May 1757	1783	Captured by French Navy	
Lizard	Henry Bird, Rotherhithe	£5,541 at £9.9s per ton	£3,879	May 1756	April 1757	March 1757	1828	Sold at Sheerness Dockyard	
Liverpool	Gorill & Pownall, Liverpool	£4,910 at £8.7s per ton	Not recorded	September 1756	February 1758	February 1758	1778	Wrecked off Long Island	
Maidstone	Thomas Seward, Rochester	£5,277 at £9.0s per ton	£4,085	October 1756	February 1758	January 1758	1794	Broken up at Sheerness Dockyard	

=== Second batch ===
Admiralty's intention for the second batch was for a total of ten frigates, swiftly and cheaply built from fir rather than oak. The design for these vessels was modified to square the stern, increasing stability in rough seas and allowing a marginal improvement in storage capacity. Construction tenders were offered to private shipyards but the proposed prices exceeded Admiralty's budget. The batch was therefore reduced to just five ships, to be built using government labour at the Royal Dockyards. The use of fir significantly reduced construction time from the average nine months for the first batch of oak-hulled frigates to three and a half months for the fir-hulled ships. However the fir timbers were significantly less durable: the four vessels that served without being captured averaged only nine years at sea before being broken up or sold. All of the second batch of vessels were out of service before any of the first batch had been retired. Admiralty returned to using oak-built hulls for all subsequent ships in the Coventry-class.

Ship	Builder	Price and contract rate	Naval fitout	Laid down	Launched	Commissioned	Out of service	Fate	Ref.
Boreas	Israel Pownoll, Woolwich Dockyard	£6,314	£2,879	April 1757	July 1757	September 1757	1770	Sold out of naval service	
Hussar	John Lock, Chatham Dockyard	£11,313 including fitout	Not recorded	May 1757	July 1757	August 1757	1762	Captured by French Navy	
Shannon	Adam Hayes, Deptford Dockyard	£9,813 including fitout	Not recorded	May 1757	August 1757	October 1757	1765	Broken up at Portsmouth Dockyard	
Trent	Israel Pownoll, Woolwich Dockyard	£6,929	£2,866	May 1757	October 1757	November 1757	1764	Sold out of naval service	
Actaeon	John Lock, Chatham Dockyard	£11,228 including fitout	Not recorded	May 1757	September 1757	November 1757	1766	Sold out of naval service	

=== Third batch ===
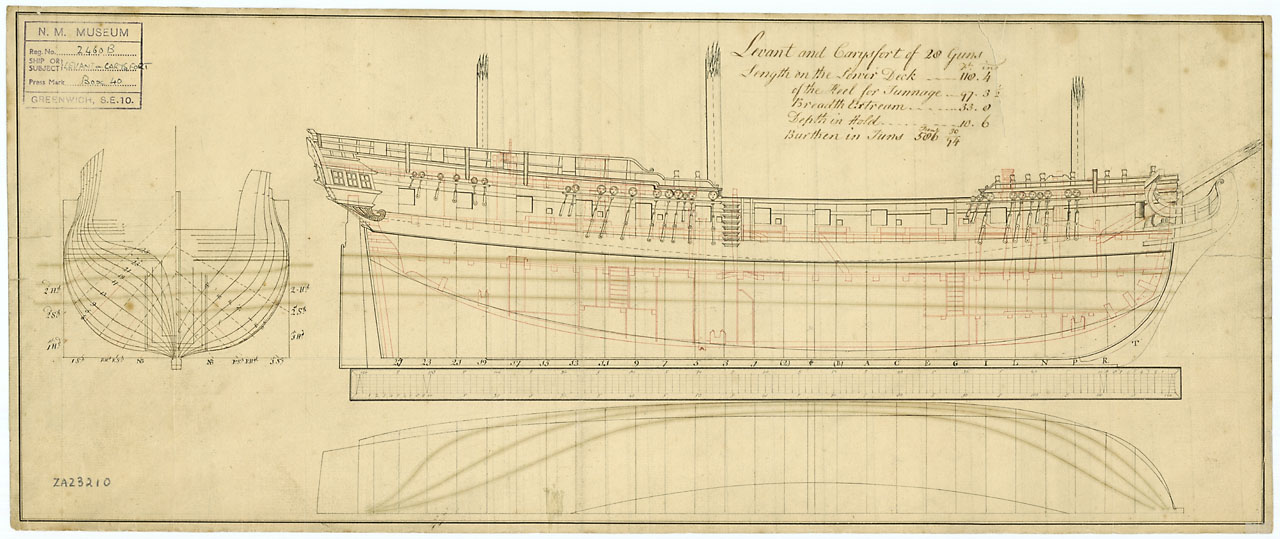
Body plan of Carysfort and Levant, two of the third batch of the Coventry class.

9 oak-built ships

Ship	Builder	Price and contract rate	Naval fitout	Laid down	Launched	Commissioned	Out of service	Fate	Ref.
Active	Thomas Staunton & Co, Rotherhithe	£6,229 at £10.12s per ton	£3,953	June 1757	January 1758	January 1758	1778	Captured by French Navy	
Aquilon	Robert Inwood, Rotherhithe	£6,156 at £10.10s per ton	£4,049	June 1757	May 1758	May 1758	1776	Sold at Deptford Dockyard	
Cerberus	Pleasant Fenn, Cowes Shipyard, East Cowes	£5,276 at £9.0s per ton	£4,227	June 1757	September 1758	May 1758	1778	Burned to prevent capture, Rhode Island	
Griffin	Moody Janvrin, Bursledon	£5,276 at £10.0s per ton	£4,275	June 1757	October 1758	October 1757	1761	Wrecked off Barbuda	
Levant	Henry Adams, Buckler's Hard	£5,423 at £9.5s per ton	£4,906	June 1757	July 1758	October 1758	1780	Broken up, Deptford Dockyard	

- Argo
  - Ordered: 19 September 1757
  - Built by: Henry Bird, Rotherhithe.
  - Keel laid: 22 September 1757
  - Launched: 20 July 1758
  - Completed: 29 January 1759 at Deptford Dockyard.
  - Fate: Taken to pieces at Portsmouth Dockyard in November 1776.
- Milford
  - Ordered: 19 September 1757
  - Built by: Richard Chitty, Milford.
  - Keel laid: November 1757
  - Launched: 20 September 1759
  - Completed: 28 December 1759 at builder's shipyard.
  - Fate: Sold at Woolwich Dockyard on 17 May 1785.
- Guadeloupe
  - Ordered: 19 September 1757
  - (originally ordered from John Williams, Neyland (Pembs.), but the ordered was transferred to Plymouth Dockyard following Williams's bankruptcy in 1758.)
  - Re-ordered: 29 June 1758
  - Built by: Plymouth Dockyard.
  - Keel laid: 8 May 1759
  - Launched: 5 December 1763
  - Completed: 11 July 1764.
  - Fate: Scuttled in York River, Virginia on 10 October 1781, but salved by the French Navy in which service she was maintained until 1786.
- Carysfort
  - Ordered: 4 February 1764
  - Built by: Sheerness Dockyard.
  - Keel laid: June 1764
  - Launched: 23 August 1766
  - Completed: 11 August 1767
  - Fate: Sold at Deptford Dockyard on 28 April 1813.

=== Final batch ===
2 oak-built ships, only 1 completed

- Hind
  - Ordered: 2 October 1782
  - Built by: Sheerness Dockyard.
  - Keel laid: February 1783
  - Launched: 22 July 1785
  - Completed: 24 November 1787 at Deptford Dockyard.
  - Fate: Taken to pieces at Deptford Dockyard in July 1811.
- Laurel
  - Ordered: 22 October 1782
  - Built by: Philemon Jacobs, Sandgate.
  - Cancelled: 7 October 1783.

== Bibliography ==
- David Lyon, The Sailing Navy List, Brasseys Publications, London 1993.
- Winfield, Rif (2007). British Warships of the Age of Sail 1714–1792: Design, Construction, Careers and Fates. Seaforth. ISBN 9781844157006..
