= Imprest system =

Form of accounting

The imprest system is a form of financial accounting. The most common is petty cash. The basic characteristic of an imprest system is that a fixed amount is reserved, which after a certain period or when circumstances require, because money was spent, will be replenished. This replenishment will come from another account, e.g. petty cash may be replenished by cashing a cheque drawn on a bank account or using an ATM.

== Petty cash imprest system ==
A petty cash imprest system is a method of managing small cash expenses in a business or organization. Under this system, a fixed amount of cash is set aside in a petty cash fund, which is used to pay for small and infrequent expenses like office supplies or postage.

The system operates on the principle of replenishment, whereby the petty cash fund is maintained at a constant level by reimbursing only the amount spent. For instance, if the starting balance of the petty cash fund is $100, and $90 is spent during the month, the fund is replenished by crediting $90 to the primary cash account, typically a bank account, and debiting the respective expense accounts based on the petty cash receipt dockets.

The journal entry for replenishment typically includes debiting the expense accounts and crediting the petty cash account for the amount spent. Subsequently, it involves crediting the bank account and debiting the petty cash account for the amount reimbursed.

== Advantages ==
In this example the maximum amount of petty cash that can be issued (spent) is $100. The claimant may only spend what they have and is only replenished with what they spend, in this case $90.

In a non-imprest system where a fixed amount is issued every month, e.g., $100 every time cash is required, proponents assert there is little incentive to ensure all money issued has been documented because when money is all spent a check for a fixed amount is issued. It is much more difficult to reconcile a non-imprest system as one never knows how much exactly should be in the float.

In an imprest system the amount requested is documented with petty cash dockets and their associated receipts or invoices. Therefore, at all times one can check how much should be left in the petty cash float by deducting the amount spent from the opening petty cash float.

== How the petty cash imprest system works ==
The imprest system necessitates the documentation of expenditures. In a petty cash system, receipts are written for each amount issued. At the end of the month, the total of these receipts is subtracted from the opening float, and the resulting value should match the remaining amount in the float. Under the imprest system, only recorded expenditures are replenished. Any shortfalls may be addressed by the individual responsible for the float, typically a bookkeeper, using their own resources.
