= HMS Echo (1758) =

History

Great Britain
- Name: Echo
- Launched: 1757 as French frigate Écho from Nantes
- Completed: March 1758
- Acquired: 29 May 1758
- Decommissioned: 1764
- In service: 1759–1764
- Out of service: 1764–1770
- Fate: Sold out of service, Chatham Dockyard, 5 June 1770

General characteristics
- Class & type: 24-gun sixth-rate
- Tons burthen: 539 54/94 bm
- Length: 118 ft 2 in (36.0 m) (gundeck); 96 ft 9.5 in (29.5 m) (keel)
- Beam: 32 ft 4.5 in (9.9 m)
- Depth of hold: 9 ft 11.5 in (3.0 m)
- Complement: 160
- Armament: 24 × 9-pdrs

HMS Echo was a 24-gun sixth-rate of the Royal Navy, in active service between 1758 and 1764, during the Seven Years' War.

Originally the French frigate Écho, she was captured by HMS Juno in 1758 and refitted as a privateer hunter. Stationed in the Caribbean, she captured a total of five enemy vessels over the following five years. She was declared surplus to Navy requirement at the end of the War in 1763, and was decommissioned at Chatham Dockyard. After six years at the Dockyard, she was sold out of service in 1770.

== Construction ==
Construction commenced in 1756 in Nantes, shortly after the outbreak of war between France and Britain. The vessel was originally intended as a privateer named Maréchal de Richelieu, but was purchased by the French Navy in December 1757. Completed in early 1759, she was commissioned into that Navy as the 28-gun frigate Écho and assigned to duties in the French Caribbean.

As built, Écho was 118 ft 2 in (36.0 m) long with a short 96 ft 9.5 in (29.5 m) keel and an unusually broad beam of 32 ft 4.5 in (9.9 m). Her sides were low, with a hold depth of only 9 ft 11.5 in (3.0 m), nearly 4 ft (1.2 m) less than similar vessels such as the privateer La Marie Victoire. Her armament as a French vessel was 28 guns, comprising 24 nine-pounder cannons and four smaller weapons. After her capture by the British these four smaller guns were removed. Her crew numbers as a French vessel are unrecorded; the designated Royal Navy complement was 160 men.
