= HMS Hind (1785) =

Coventry-class Royal Navy frigate

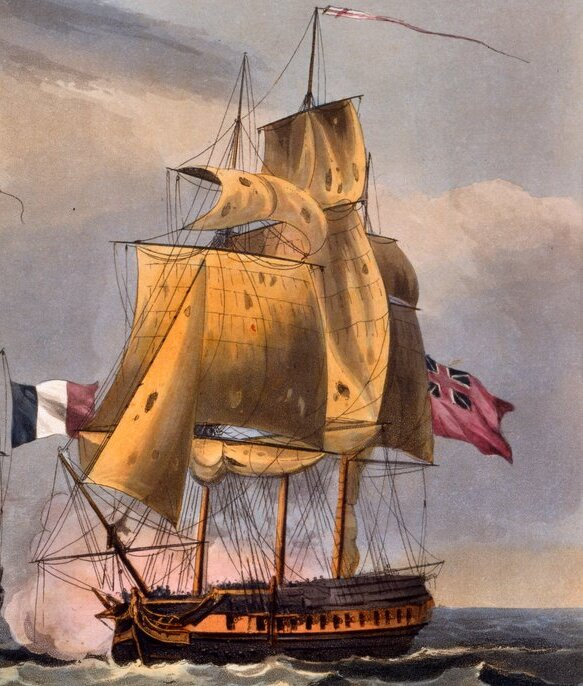
- Hind was built to the same design as HMS Carysfort, (pictured)

History

Great Britain
- Name: Hind
- Ordered: 2 October 1782
- Builder: Clayton & Willson, Sandgate, Kent
- Laid down: February 1783
- Launched: 22 July 1785
- Completed: 24 November 1787 at Deptford Dockyard
- Commissioned: May 1790
- Fate: Broken up at Deptford in July 1811

General characteristics
- Class & type: Coventry-class sixth-rate frigate
- Tons burthen: 59079/94 (bm)
- Length: 118 ft 5 in (36.1 m) (gundeck); 97 ft 4 in (29.7 m) (keel)
- Beam: 33 ft 10 in (10.31 m)
- Depth of hold: 10 ft 6 in (3.20 m)
- Sail plan: Full-rigged ship
- Complement: 200
- Armament: (As built): Upperdeck: 24 × 9-pounder guns; Quarterdeck: 4 × 3-pounder guns & 4 × 18-pounder carronades; 12 × ½-pdr swivel guns

HMS Hind was a 28-gun sixth-rate frigate of the Royal Navy.

== Design ==
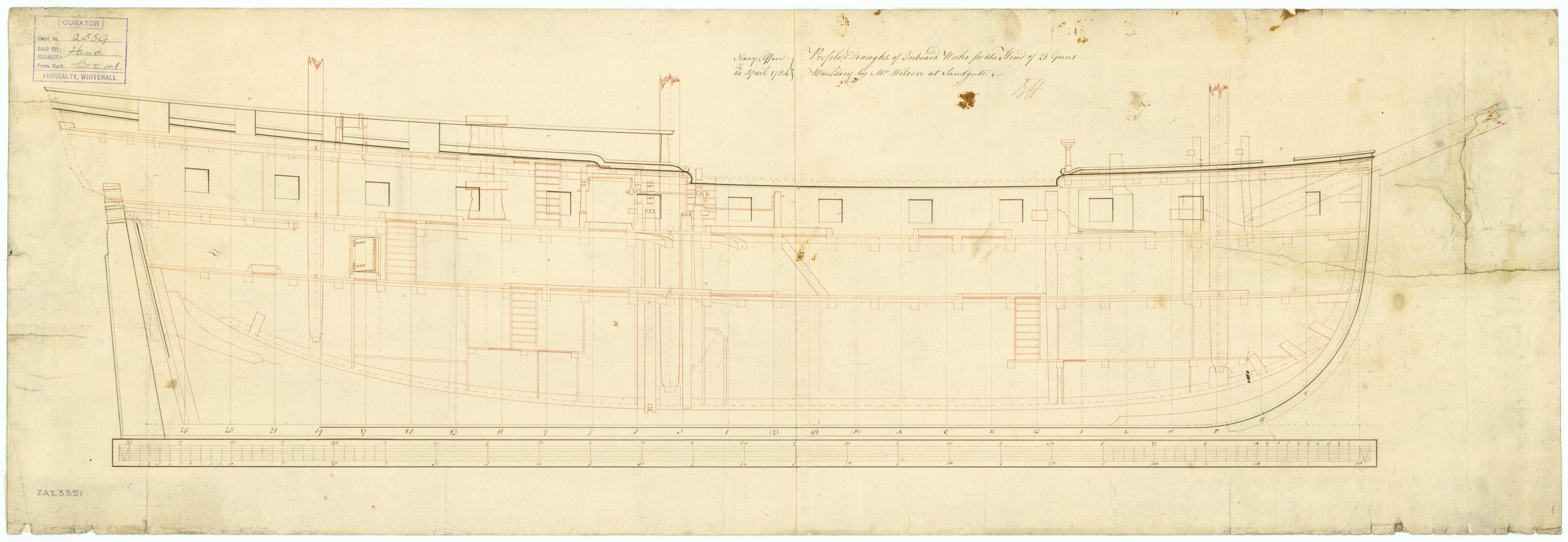
Hind (1785)

The ship was a revival of the Coventry class, designed in 1756 by Sir Thomas Slade as a development of his HMS Lyme of 1748, "with such alterations as may tend to the better stowing of men and carrying for guns." The design was slightly modified for the Hind and its projected sistership Laurel (which was cancelled after the builder went bankrupt).

== Career ==
After launch, Hind was completed at Deptford Dockyard from 1785 until 24 November 1787 but was not commissioned until May 1790, when she went into service under the command of Captain Alexander Cochrane until 1793. The captain's nephew, Thomas Cochrane saw his first sea service under his uncle's captaincy.

== French Revolutionary Wars ==
HMS Crescent captured the French privateer Espoir, of ten guns, on 2 March 1793. By agreement, Crescent shared the bounty bill with Hind.

Under Cochrane, Hind captured a number of vessels in 1793:

- Merchant vessels: Superb, from Guadaloupe for Havre, and Jeune Charlotte, from Toulon for Brest.
- Privateers: Egalite (8 guns; April), Aimiable Marie (10 guns; March), Custein (or Custine; February), Taquin (or Tarquin; 16 guns; April), Georgette (May), and Liberté (12 guns; April)
- Recaptured British vessels: Paspebiac, and the sloop Mary.

Georgette was under the command of Jean-Pierre Edet. She came from Nantes and was of 300 tons (French; "of load"). She was armed with sixteen 4 and 6-pounder guns, and had a crew of 120 men. (Note: Edet escaped from British custody at Falmouth. He later would command the privateer Alexandre, which the Royal Navy would also capture quickly.) She had captured a small brig before Hind captured her. (Note: The brig was Eilzabeth, Leys, master, which had been sailing from Jersey to Newfoundland.)

In 1794 Hind was commanded by Captain Philip Durham, in 1795 Captain Philip Lee, and in 1796 Captain John Bazely. In June 1797 command passed to Captain Joseph Larcom, who remained with her until she paid off from service following the Peace of Amiens. While Larcom was in command, Hind captured the Spanish privateer Aimable Juana on 23 April 1798. (Note: Head money for 46 men was paid in November 1829. A first-class share was worth £65 3s 4½d; a fifth-class share, that of a seaman, was worth 5s 9½d.)

In January 1796 Hind captured the 97 ton (bm), Favori at (49°40′N 15°4′W). Favori had been launched in New England in 1778, and was disguised as an American vessel before she was captured.

War of the Second Coalition: On 10 April, 1799 she and sloop HMS Swan captured American merchant sloop "Fair Columbian" off the coast of Florida (29°09′N 78°48′W). Eventually Fair Columbian's crew reasserted control of the ship and brought her into Baltimore.

== Napoleonic Wars ==
She was refitted at Frindsbury in 1804–1805, and recommissioned at Chatham in June 1805 under Captain Francis Fane for Mediterranean service. In April 1808 command passed to Captain Richard Vincent, then in 1809 Captain John Lumley.

Hind captured the privateer Téméraire, of two guns and 30 men on 29 September 1809 off Milazzo. She was four days out of Naples and had not made any captures.

In 1810 Captain Spelman Swaine replaced Lumley.

== Fate ==
She was taken to pieces at Deptford in July 1811.
