= Spar (sailing) =

Rigging pole

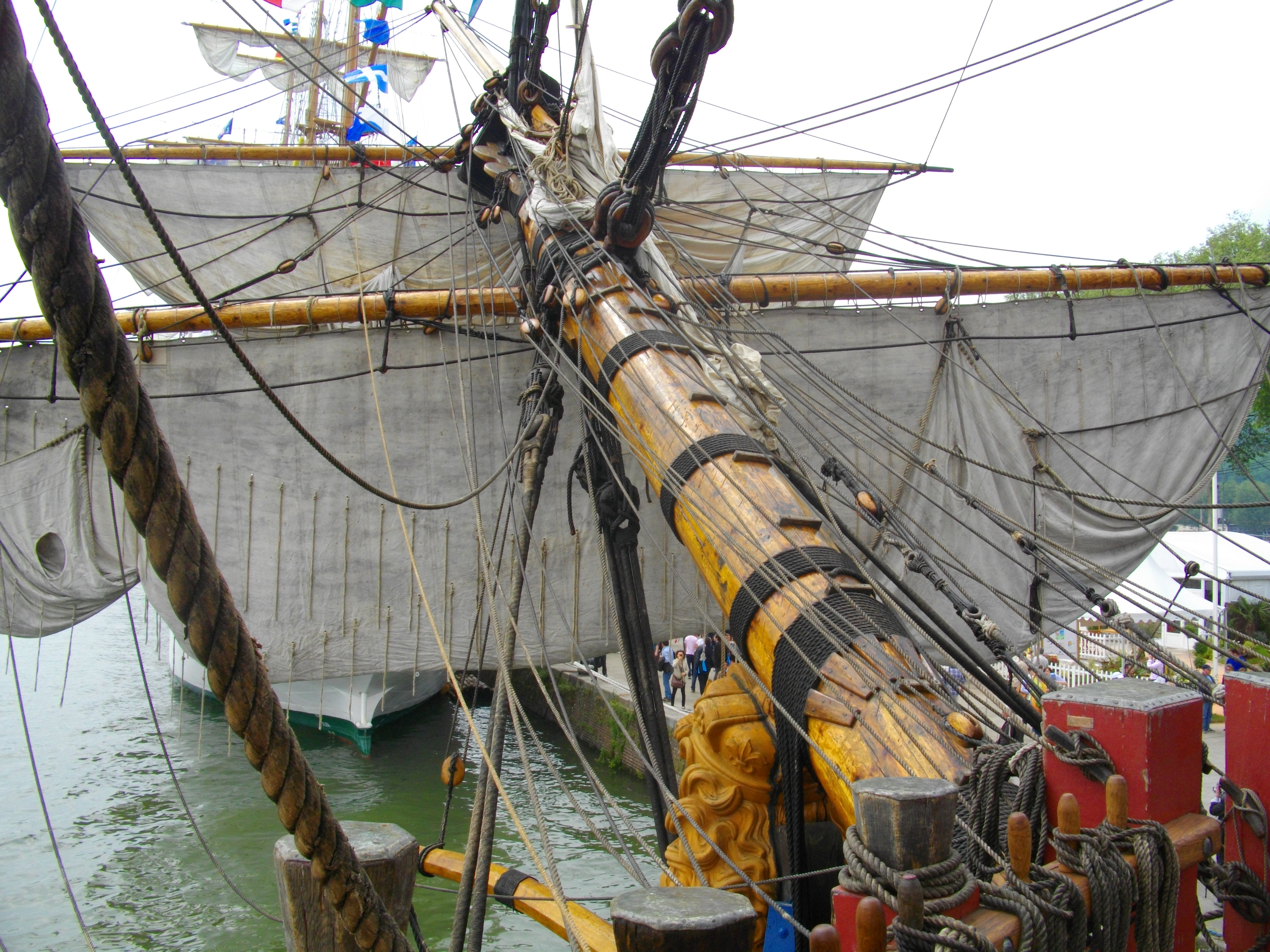

A spar is a pole of wood, metal or lightweight materials such as carbon fibre used in the rigging of a sailing vessel to carry or support its sail. These include yards, booms, and masts, which serve both to deploy sail and resist compressive and bending forces, as well as the bowsprit and spinnaker pole.

In larger vessels during the Age of Sail, spare spars could be roped together to provide a temporary surface known as a "spar deck". These served as jury-rigged repairs for permanent decks, or as an additional platform under which to shelter goods or crew. The term was also informally applied to areas of the forecastle or quarterdeck where spare spars were stored by laying them flat against the existing decking. In the modern era the term has been used to describe the uppermost deck on flush decked vessels.
