= Widow's man =

Fictitious seaman in the Royal Navy

A widow's man was a fictitious seaman kept in the books of Royal Navy ships during the 18th and early 19th centuries so that their pay and rations could be redistributed to the families of dead crew members. This financial arrangement helped keep widows from being left destitute following the deaths of their seafaring husbands.

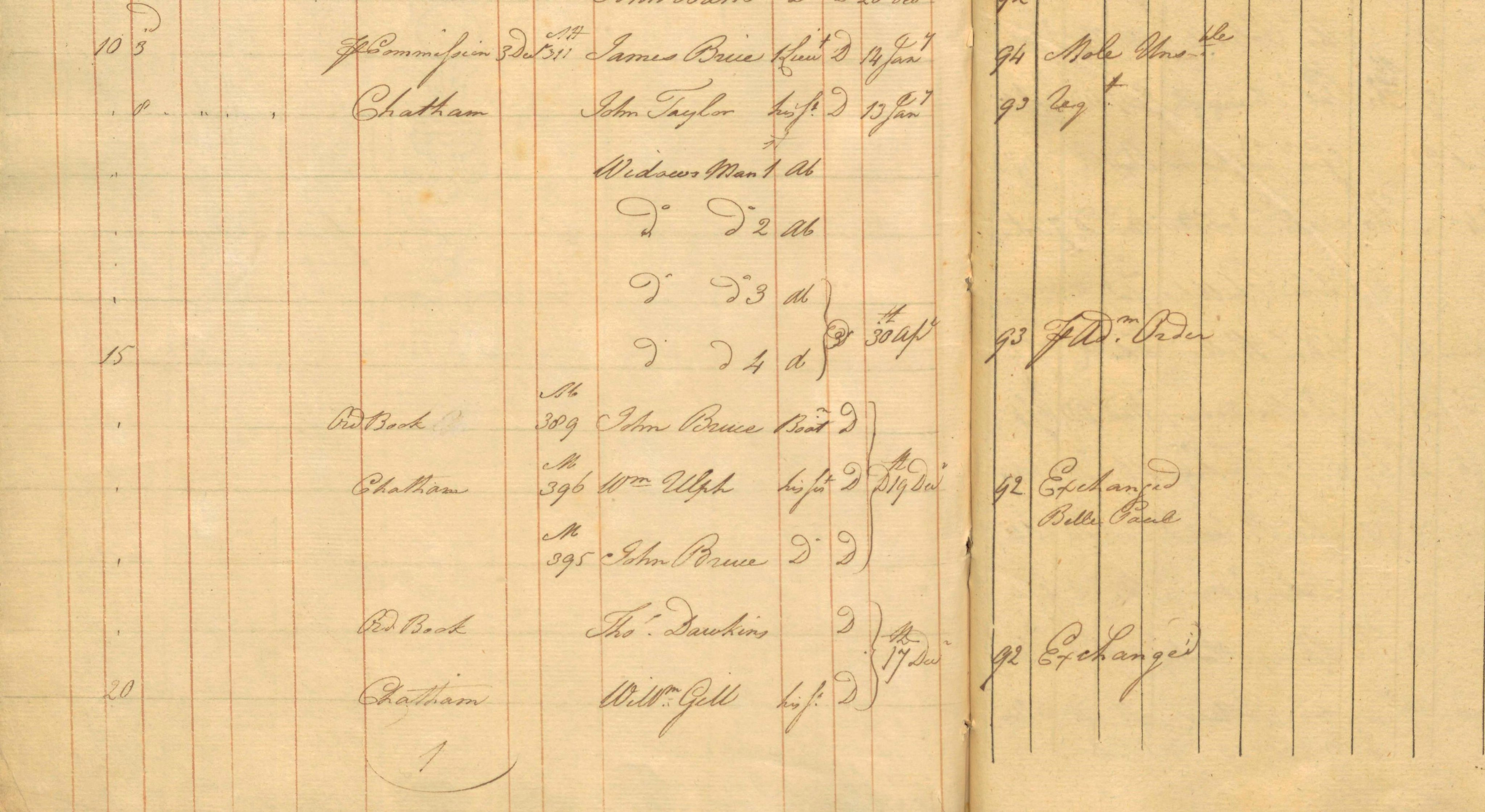
HMS Hermione, muster roll, 7 April to 7 July 1797, p.1 "Widows Man", numbers 12 -15

== Practice ==
The number of widows' men on a ship was proportional to the ship's size. A first-rate might have as many as eighteen, while a sixth-rate might have only three. The ratio was reduced by Admiralty order on 25 October 1790.

The existence of widows' men served as an incentive for men to join the Royal Navy, rather than the Merchant Navy, as their families might be provided for if they died.

== Historical research ==
This procedure can lead to some confusion to modern students of history. For example, the sloop Discovery carried 153 men on its voyage exploring Puget Sound, but the widow's man brings its official complement to 154. Reportedly, in 1738, the sloop Wolf discharged its widow's man when the company was reduced; whether this was an accident or an attempt to maintain crew strength is difficult to determine.
