= HMS Hussar (1757) =

Coventry-class Royal Navy frigate

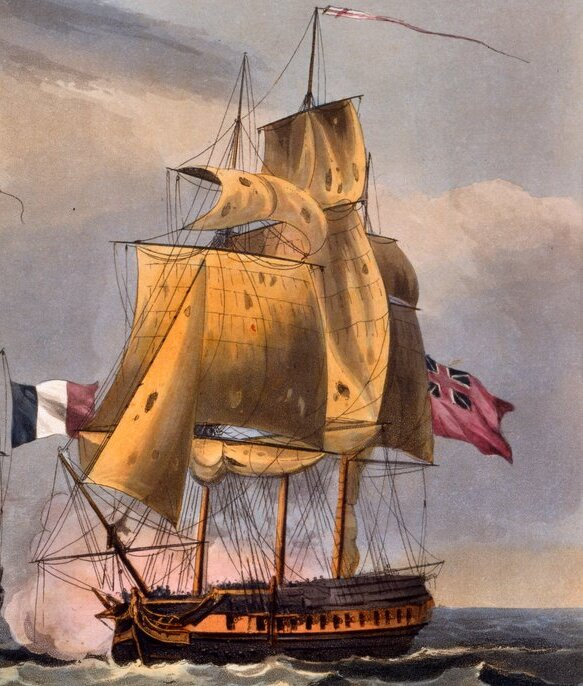
- Hussar was built to the same design as HMS Carysfort, (pictured)

History

Great Britain
- Name: HMS Hussar
- Ordered: 18 April 1757
- Builder: Chatham Dockyard
- Laid down: 3 May 1757
- Launched: 23 July 1757
- Completed: 17 August 1757
- Commissioned: July 1757
- Fate: Taken by the French off Cape Francois 23 May 1762

General characteristics
- Class & type: 28-gun Coventry-class sixth-rate frigate
- Tons burthen: 586 6/94 bm
- Length: 118 ft 3 in (36.0 m) (gundeck); 97 ft 2.5 in (29.6 m) (keel)
- Beam: 33 ft 8 in (10.3 m)
- Depth of hold: 10 ft 5.5 in (3.19 m)
- Sail plan: Full-rigged ship
- Complement: 200 officers and men
- Armament: 28 guns comprising: Upperdeck: 24 × 9-pounder guns; Quarterdeck: 4 × 3-pounder guns; 12 × ½-pdr swivel guns

HMS Hussar was a 28-gun Coventry-class sixth-rate frigate of the Royal Navy.

== Construction ==
The Hussar was one of five frigates of the class built of fir rather than oak. Fir was cheaper and more abundant than oak and permitted noticeably faster construction, but at a cost of a reduced lifespan; the four fir-built Coventry-class vessels that did not get captured lasted an average of only nine years before being struck off.

John Inglis served on the ship as a midshipman in 1758 at the beginning of his career, under his in-law, Captain John Elliot.

== See also ==
- List of ships captured in the 18th century
