= List of ship launches in 1758 =

The list of ship launches in 1758 includes a chronological list of some ships launched in 1758.

Date	Ship	Class	Builder	Location	Country	Notes
11 January	Active	Coventry-class frigate	Thomas Stanton	Rotherhithe	Great Britain	For Royal Navy.
20 January	Rippon	Fourth rate	Israel Pownoll	Woolwich Dockyard	Great Britain	For Royal Navy.
23 January	Tamar	Favourite-class sloop of war	John Snooks	Saltash	Great Britain	For Royal Navy.
9 February	Maidstone	Coventry-class frigate	Thomas Seward	Rochester	Great Britain	For Royal Navy.
10 February	Liverpool	Coventry-class frigate	John Gorill & William Pownall	Liverpool	Great Britain	For Royal Navy.
23 February	Shrewsbury	Dublin-class ship of the line	Wells & Co.	Deptford Dockyard	Great Britain	For Royal Navy.
25 February	Lenox	Dublin-class ship of the line	John Lock	Chatham Dockyard	Great Britain	For Royal Navy.
11 March	Venus	Venus-class frigate	John Okill	Liverpool	Great Britain	For Royal Navy.
6 April	Prins Gustaf	Third rate	Gilbert Sheldon	Karlskrona	Sweden	For Royal Swedish Navy.
8 April	Warspite	Dublin-class ship of the line	Thomas West	Deptford Dockyard	Great Britain	For Royal Navy.
10 April	Thames	Richmond-class frigate	Henry Adams	Bucklers Hard	Great Britain	For Royal Navy.
25 April	Chatham	Fourth rate	Edward Allin	Portsmouth Dockyard	Great Britain	For Royal Navy.
10 May	Fantasque	Lion-class ship of the line	Joseph Véronique Charles Chapelle	Toulon	Kingdom of France	For French Navy.
16 May	Samson	Bomb vessel	I. Ilyin	Saint Petersburg	Russia	For Imperial Russian Navy.
18 May	Christianborg	Frigate		Copenhagen	Denmark-Norway	For Dano-Norwegian Navy.
24 May	Aquilon	Coventry-class frigate	Robert Inwood	Rotherhithe	Great Britain	For Royal Navy.
24 May	Conqueror	Third rate	Barnard	Harwich	Great Britain	For Royal Navy.
22 June	Panther	Edgar-class ship of the line	Martin and Henneker	Chatham Dockyard	Great Britain	For Royal Navy.
6 July	Levant	Coventry-class frigate	Henry Adams	Bucklers Hard	Great Britain	For Royal Navy.
20 July	Argo	Coventry-class frigate	Henry Bird	Rotherhithe	Great Britain	For Royal Navy.
20 July	Conquistador	Fourth rate	Matthew Mullins	Cádiz	Spain	For Spanish Navy.
August	Chimère	Frigate		Toulon	Kingdom of France	For French Navy.
2 September	Robuste	Ship of the line	Antoine Groignard	Lorient	Kingdom of France	For French Navy.
4 September	Stag	Niger-class frigate	Thomas Stanton	Rotherhithe	Great Britain	For Royal Navy.
5 September	Cerberus	Coventry-class frigate	Pleasant Fenn	East Cowes	Great Britain	For Royal Navy.
19 September	Alarm	Niger-class frigate	Barnard & Turner	Harwich	Great Britain	For Royal Navy.
18 October	Griffin	Coventry-class frigate	Moody Janverin	Bursledon	Great Britain	For Royal Navy.
3 November	Temple	Third rate	Blades	Hull	Great Britain	For Royal Navy.
6 November	Prins Karl	Third rate	Gilbert Sheldon	Karlskrona	Sweden	For Royal Swedish Navy.
16 November	Edgar	Edgar-class ship of the line	Randall	Rotherhithe	Great Britain	For Royal Navy.
29 November	Aeolus	Niger-class frigate	Thomas West	Deptford Dockyard	Great Britain	For Royal Navy.
30 November	Solitaire	Third rate	Chevalier Antoine Groignard	Lorient	Kingdom of France	For French Navy.
2 December	La Subtile	Frigate	François Caro	Lorient	Kingdom of France	For Compagnie des Indes.
14 December	Resolution	Dublin-class ship of the line	Henry Bird	Northam	Great Britain	For Royal Navy.
Unknown date	Ajax	East Indiaman	John Perry	Blackwall	Great Britain	For British East India Company.
Unknown date	Calcutta	East Indiaman	John Wells	Deptford	Great Britain	For British East India Company.
Unknown date	Comet	Sloop of war		Bombay	India	For Royal Navy.
Unknown date	Earl of Halifax	Sloop of War		Fort Niagara, New York	Thirteen Colonies	For Royal Navy.
Unknown date	Hısn-ı Bahri	Second rate		Constantinople	Ottoman Empire	For Ottoman Navy.
Unknown date	Couleuvre	Unrated		Rochefort	Kingdom of France	For French Navy.
Unknown date	Land Tortoise	Radeau		Fort Niagara, New York	Thirteen Colonies	For Royal Navy.
Unknown date	Vive	Unrated		Rochefort	Kingdom of France	For French Navy.
Unknown date	L'Entreprenant	Privateer			Kingdom of France	For Private owner.
Unknown date	Espion	Felucca	Journe	Toulon	Kingdom of France	For French Navy.
Unknown date	Mecklenburgh	Cutter			Kingdom of France	For private owner.
Unknown date	Pocock	East Indiaman		London	Great Britain	For British East India Company.
Unknown date	Sanct Croix	Fourth rate			Denmark-Norway	For Dano-Norwegian Navy.
Unknown date	Sun Prize	Sixth rate			Great Britain	For Royal Navy.
Unknown date	Valentine	East Indiaman		London	Great Britain	For British East India Company.
Unknown date	Woolwich Chain Boat	Chain boat	Bennett	Faversham	Great Britain	For Royal Navy.
Unknown date	Name unknown	Merchantman		Philadelphia, Pennsylvania	Thirteen Colonies	For Private owner.
Unknown date	Unnamed	Mooring lighter		Faversham	Great Britain	For Royal Navy.
