= Corregidor =

Island in the Philippines

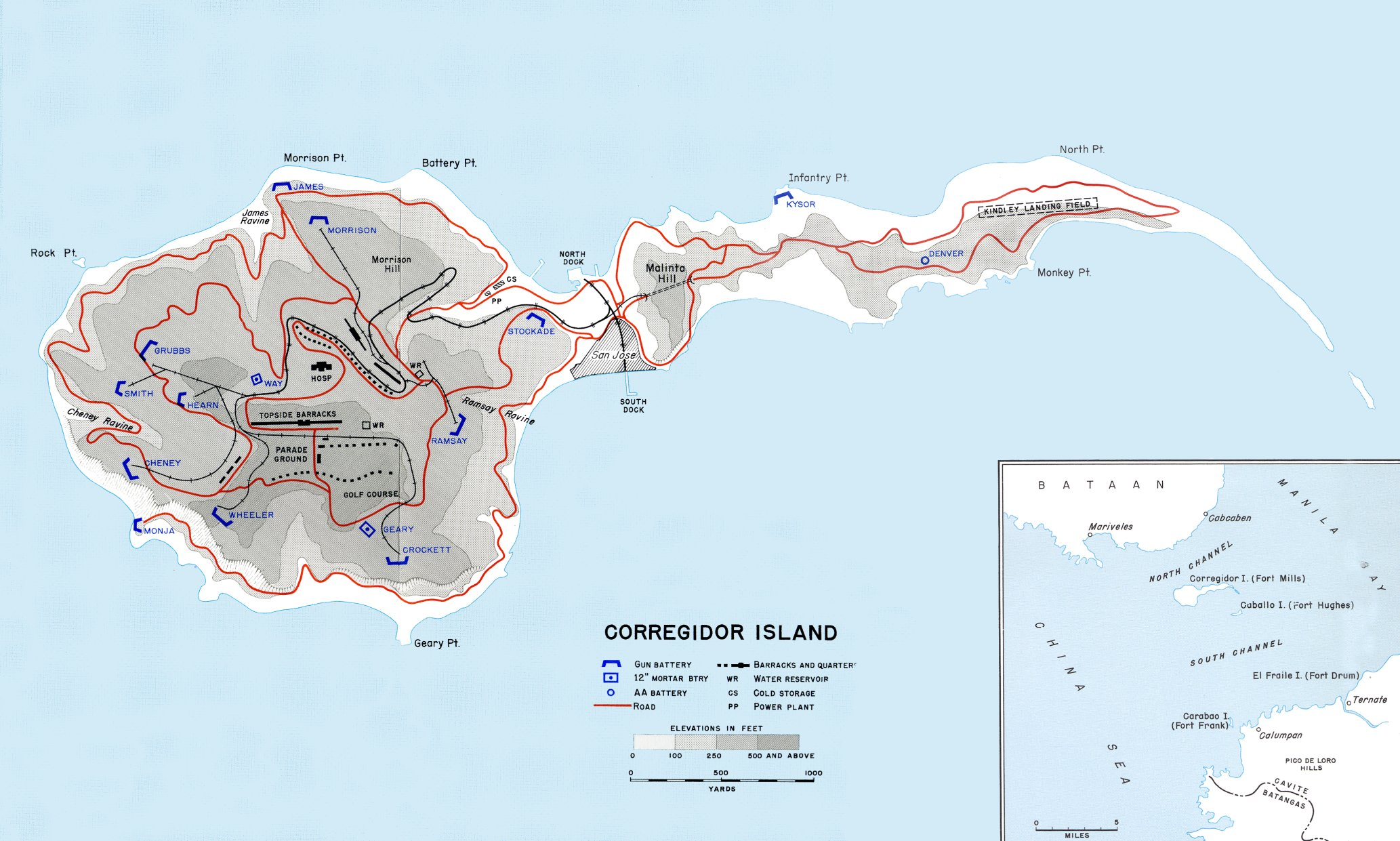

- Location within Philippines Location within Luzon

Geography
- Location: Manila Bay
- Coordinates: 14°23′8″N 120°34′23″E
- Archipelago: Philippine Islands
- Area: 5.49 km^{2} (2.12 sq mi)
- Length: 6.5 km (4.04 mi)
- Width: 2.0 km (1.24 mi)
- Highest elevation: 589 ft (179.5 m)
- Highest point: Topside, a plateau

Administration
- Philippines
- Province: Cavite
- City: Cavite City
- Barangay: Barangay 8 (Manuel S. Rojas)

Additional information

Corregidor (Tagalog: [ko.ɾɛ.hɪˈdoɾ], Spanish: [ko.re.xiˈðoɾ], Tagalog: Pulo ng Corregidor, Spanish: Isla del Corregidor) is an island located at the entrance of Manila Bay in the southwestern part of Luzon in the Philippines, and is considered part of Cavite City in the province of Cavite despite being closer to Maragondon and Bataan. It is 48 km (30 mi) west of Manila, the nation's capital city and one of its most important seaports for centuries since the Spanish colonial period. Due to its strategic location, Corregidor has historically been fortified with coastal artillery batteries to defend the entrance of Manila Bay and Manila itself from attacks by enemy warships.

Corregidor (Fort Mills) is the largest of the islands that formed the harbor defenses of Manila Bay, together with El Fraile Island (Fort Drum), Caballo Island (Fort Hughes), and Carabao Island (Fort Frank), which were all fortified during the American colonial period. The island was also the site of a small military airfield, as part of the defense.

During World War II, Corregidor played an important role during the invasion and liberation of the Philippines from the Imperial Japanese Army. The island was heavily bombarded during the later part of the war, and the ruins serve as a military memorial to the American, Filipino, and Japanese soldiers who died. Corregidor is a major historical site, and one of the busiest tourist attractions in the Philippines.

== Geography ==
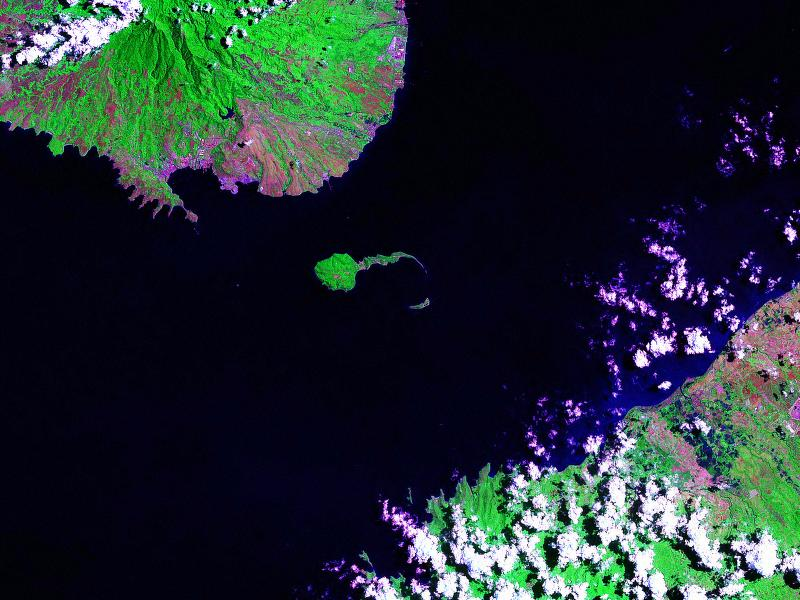
Corregidor Island and the entrance to Manila Bay.

Despite being located nearer to the southern coast of Bataan, Corregidor and the other fortified islands of Manila Bay fall under the jurisdiction of the City of Cavite. Corregidor, also known as "The Rock" for its rocky landscape and the heavy fortifications, along with Caballo Island, about 1.7 km (1.1 mi) south, divide the entrance of Manila Bay into the North and South Channel.

The tadpole-shaped island, with its tail running eastward, is about 6.5 km (4.0 mi) long, about 2.0 km (1.2 mi) wide at its widest with a total land area of about 900 hectares (2,200 acres). The highest elevation is at 180 m (590 ft) on the Topside. The island is divided into four sections:

=== Topside ===
The island's largest area, which points towards the South China Sea, rises prominently to a large flat area that is called "Topside". Beneath this was the fortified communications center of the island, as well as the location for the Army headquarters, barracks for enlisted men, a branch of the Philippine Trust Co. bank, the Cine Corregidor movie theater, officers' quarters, underground ordnance shops, the parade ground, an Officers' Club with a 9-hole Golf Course, tennis courts, and swimming pool, and the bulk of the artillery batteries that constituted the strength of Corregidor.

=== Middleside ===
Middleside is a small plateau that interrupts the upward slope from Bottomside to Topside, and was the location of 2-story officers' quarters, barracks for the enlisted men, a hospital, quarters for non-commissioned officers, a service club, PX, and two schoolhouses—one for the children of Filipino soldiers and the other for American children.

=== Bottomside ===
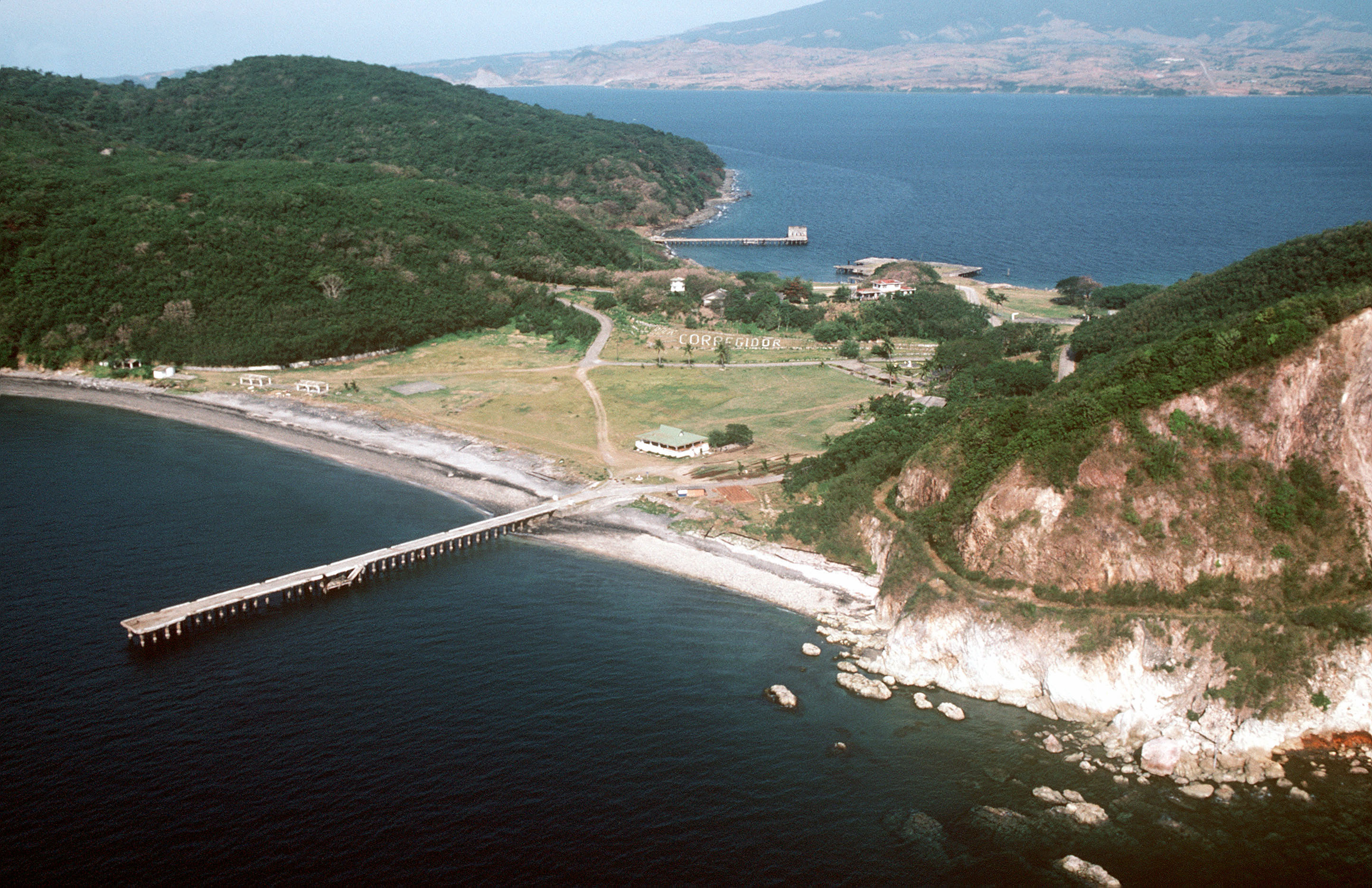
Bottomside in 1982

Bottomside is the lower part of the island and is the neck that connects the tail and head of the island. South of Bottomside was Barangay or Barrio San José (near what was Navy Beach); on the north is what was Army Dock, with its three large piers, and, east of Bottomside, is the Malinta Tunnel. The Malinta Hill separates Bottomside from the Tail End.

=== Tailside ===
The Tailside or Tail End is the remaining portion of the island where different memorials, shrines and the island's airstrip are located. Kindley Field was constructed in the early 1920s and named in honor of an early hero of the U.S. Army Air Corps. The airfield was operated then by the army, and the navy had a seaplane base. The short runway, cramped and hilly terrain had limited its use.

In 1968 during the first term of Ferdinand Marcos, Tailside became the site of the Jabidah massacre, an event which angered the Philippines Muslim minority enough to trigger the Moro conflict, eventually leading to the creation of the Bangsamoro Autonomous Region in Muslim Mindanao (BARMM).

== Geology ==
Corregidor and Caballo islands are remnants of a volcanic crater, the Corregidor Caldera, which was last active about one million years ago. However, the Philippine Institute of Volcanology and Seismology (PHIVOLCS) still classifies Corregidor as a potentially active volcano.

== History ==
=== Pre-colonial era ===
In the 13th century, local fishing villages dotted the island, then it became a hub for Chinese pirates and later by the Muslim Moros.

=== Spanish colonial era ===
The island came under Spanish sovereignty on May 19, 1570, when Miguel Lopez de Legazpi and his forces arrived in Manila Bay. Legazpi was authorized by the Spanish Crown to establish the capital of the Philippines in Manila, and to convert the Muslims in Luzon and Mindanao to Christianity. Corregidor was used as a support site for the nine Spanish galleons used during the campaign.

Under Spanish rule, Corregidor served not only as a fortress of defense, a penal institution, and a station for customs inspection, but also as a signal outpost to warn Manila of the approach of hostile ships.

The name "Corregidor" comes from the Spanish word corregir, meaning "to correct". Isla del Corregidor, the old name of the place, literally means "the Corregidor's island".

Several explanations for how the island was named have been suggested. One story states that the island was called Isla del Corregidor (literally, Island of the Corrector) due to the Spanish customs system, wherein all ships entering Manila Bay were required to stop and have their documents checked and "corrected". Another version claims that the island was used as a penitentiary or correctional institution by the Spanish government, and thus came to be called El Corregidor. Corregidor is also a specific position of authority within the former Spanish administrative structure, the title for the man who was the head of a territorial unit known as un corregimiento. The institution of administrative districts called corregimientos (with each district chief known as El Corregidor) was in use throughout Spanish America and the Philippines. For example, the Philippines had "corregidores" in charge of Bataan and Zambales, among others.

On November 23, 1574, the Chinese pirate Limahong and his 65-vessel fleet with 3,000 men anchored between Corregidor and Mariveles. From that site, he launched two successive attacks against Manila, commanded either by Limahong himself or by the Japanese pirate Sioco. Both attacks failed due to a fierce battle defense led by the governor, Juan de Salcedo.

In November and December 1600, during the Eighty Years' War between the Netherlands and Spain, the Dutch privateer and Admiral Olivier van Noort used the surroundings of Corregidor Island as an anchorage for his last two ships, Mauritius and Eendracht. From there he engaged in activities that the Spanish considered to be piracy, targeting ships on the sailing route to and from Manila. This situation ended after the naval combat of Fortune Island on December 14, 1600. The Spanish lost their flagship, the hastily converted Manila galleon San Diego, as the unbalanced weight of her extra cannon caused a permanent list and put her gun ports below the waterline. But they captured the Dutch ship Eendracht, and Admiral van Noort retreated from the Philippines. Continuing the three-year voyage in his one remaining ship and arriving home with 45 men still alive, van Noort became the first Dutch sea captain to circumnavigate the world. The Dutch East India Company was formed a few months later.

In response to these events, and also to prevent sudden attack by Muslims from Mindanao, a watch vessel was posted at Corregidor to control the entrance to the bay. According to data from 1637, this vessel had a crew of twenty men, who were paid 540 pesos a year for this task.

Corregidor Island was taken over by the Dutch in June 1647, and from there they launched an offensive against Cavite which was repelled by the Spanish garrison under the command of Andre Lopez de Azalduigui. The Dutch would remain on the island for seven more months, however, as it served them well as an operations base from which to intercept Chinese merchant traffic in the vicinity of Luzon and Cebu. Finally they withdrew with few of their expectations fulfilled.

In October 1762, during the British invasion of Manila and Cavite led by Samuel Cornish and William Draper, Corregidor was used as an anchorage for warships, particularly HMS Panther and HMS Argo. It was also used as an anchorage for the fully loaded Spanish treasure galleon Santisima Trinidad they had captured, during November 1762. The British sailed the captured galleon to Portsmouth, England, where it was sold for a fortune.

The arrival of the Spanish fleet led by General Ignacio Mario de Alava, with the mission to place the Philippine Islands on alert, did not affect the fortunes of Corregidor Island. He limited his activity to the setting up of a naval station at Cavite.

On January 18, 1853, the Corregidor Island Lighthouse was first lit on the highest part of the island, to mark the entrance of Manila Bay for vessels coming in from the South China Sea. The Spanish government built this Second-Order light, which is situated 639 feet (195 m) above sea level and visible for 20 miles (32 km).

=== Spanish–American War ===
Corregidor Island was included in the Philippines' defense plan prepared in 1885 by General Cerero, but no action was taken to implement it. When the U.S. Navy's attack was thought to be imminent, a 12 cm gun of the "Hontoria System", which came from the Spanish Navy's cruiser Antonio de Ulloa, and two shorter 12 cm guns of the same caliber from the Spanish gunboat General Lezo, were installed on the rocky island of El Fraile. On Caballo Island, south of Corregidor, the Spanish army installed three 15 cm naval guns from the Spanish navy cruiser Velasco, which was undergoing repairs.

At midnight on the night of April 30 to May 1, 1898, U.S. Navy Commodore George Dewey led his naval squadron, with his flag hoisted on board the protected cruiser USS Olympia, eastward along the southern coast of Corregidor Island, beyond the reach of Spanish batteries and with no navigational lights on, preparing to fight the Battle of Manila Bay.

At a distance about one mile off El Fraile, Dewey's fleet changed course to the northeast, steaming towards Manila. When they were discovered, the Spaniards fired from El Fraile's artillery. An American response followed immediately, first by USS McCulloch and then by USS Boston, USS Raleigh and USS Concord. Since the flotilla's speed was ten knots, they were soon far away from the Spanish batteries. Dewey sailed for Cavite where he destroyed the naval forces of Admiral Montojo.

Once the Cavite shipyard was subdued by means of a stipulated pact, two American ships went ashore at Corregidor Island on May 3 forcing the Spaniards on the island to surrender. Colonel Garces, chief of the coast batteries at the entrance of Manila Bay, and the island's governor, First Class Naval Lieutenant Augusto Miranda, were urged to come to terms with the Americans, and so they did. Therefore, Miranda remained on the island with only 100 soldiers under the Spanish flag; Garces and officers under his command, as well as 292 men with their weapons and ammunition, were transferred to Mariveles port. From there they moved through the provinces of Bataan and Pampanga until they reached Manila on May 5. There they joined the Spanish navy battalion which was already quartered in Sampaloc.

On May 4, the American ships opened fire against the 100 men who, according to the pact, had been left on Corregidor and demanded the garrison forces be reduced to 25 men. The Spanish governor consulted Manila authorities, and they ordered the evacuation of the island. The troops were sent to Naic, Cavite on boats while the island's governor was transferred to the American cruiser USS Baltimore and became a prisoner with his family. The Americans offered to free him but the governor rejected this. Shortly afterwards, he was disembarked in Balanga, Bataan. In this way the Spanish presence on Corregidor Island, which had lasted 328 years, came to an end.

A cannon that had guarded the residence of the Spanish colonial governor on Corregidor, the Dewey Cannon, was taken as a prize of war to the United States. It was later awarded to the rural town of Three Oaks, Michigan, where it was remounted as a historical display.

=== American colonial period ===
The entrance to Malinta Tunnel

In 1902, the island was organized as an American military reservation. In 1903, a convalescent hospital was established by the U.S. Army.

The Board of Fortifications chaired by William H. Taft recommended that key harbors of territories acquired after the Spanish–American War be fortified. Consequently, Corregidor was fortified and incorporated into the harbor defenses Manila and Subic Bays. In 1908, a Regular Army post was established on the island, designated as Fort Mills, in honor of Brigadier General Samuel Meyers Mills, Jr., Chief of Artillery of the U.S. Army from 1905 to 1906. By early 1909, H Company of the 2nd Battalion of the Corps of Engineers was assigned to Corregidor and started on the construction of concrete emplacements, bombproof shelters, and trails at various parts of the island. This pioneer engineer company left Fort Mills on March 15, 1912. All or part of 35 different numbered Coast Artillery Corps companies served tours at Fort Mills between 1909 and 1923.

The defense of Corregidor was the immediate responsibility of the Philippine Coast Artillery Command, commanded by Major General George F. Moore at the start of World War II. Stationed on the island after the return to the regimental system in 1924 were the following regular units:

- 59th Coast Artillery (U.S. Regular Army)
- 60th Coast Artillery AA (U.S. Regular Army)
- 91st Coast Artillery (Philippine Scouts)
- 92nd Coast Artillery (Tractor Drawn) (Philippine Scouts)
- Headquarters, Harbor Defenses of Manila and Subic Bays and the Seaward Defense Command.

In addition to Fort Mills; the army post on Caballo Island was named Fort Hughes; on El Fraile, Fort Drum; and on Carabao Island, Fort Frank. According to the war plan, these forts could withstand a six-month-long siege, after which the United States would provide aid. The fortifications on Corregidor were designed solely to withstand seaborne attack. Though American military planners realized that airplanes would render Fort Mills obsolete, the United States was restricted from improving the fortifications by the Washington Naval Treaty of 1922. In 1932–1934, the U.S. Army constructed the Malinta Tunnel, with its series of related laterals, to protect its military stores and vital installations in the event of war.

Fort Mills's defense installations had cost the U.S. government more than $150 million, which did not include the expense of fortifying the neighboring islands of Caballo, Carabao, and El Fraile.

==== Infrastructure ====
There were 65 miles (105 km) of paved roads and trails on the island and 19.5 miles (31.4 km) of electric railroad track. The latter were used largely to haul heavy equipment and ammunition from Bottomside to the different Batteries. The Corregidor High School was where children of both Filipino and American servicemen assigned on the island studied. The island also had an electric trolley system as public transport, a movie house (Cine Corregidor), a baseball field and a swimming pool. The business and social center of this community was found on Topside.

==== Water supply ====
Before the war and during the siege, Corregidor depended on Bataan for most of its potable water. For this purpose, barges were used to haul water either from Mariveles or Cabcaben, Bataan.

=== World War II ===
During World War II, Corregidor was the site of two costly sieges and pitched battles—the first during the first months of 1942, and the second in February 1945—between the Imperial Japanese Army and the U.S. Army, along with its smaller subsidiary force, the Philippine Army.

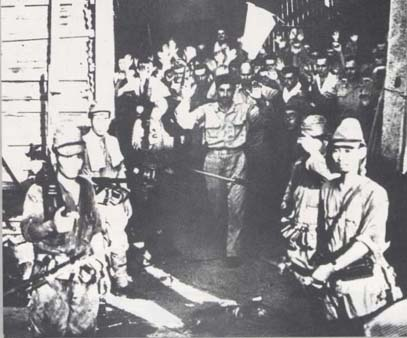
The surrender of U.S. forces at the Malinta Tunnel on May 6, 1942.

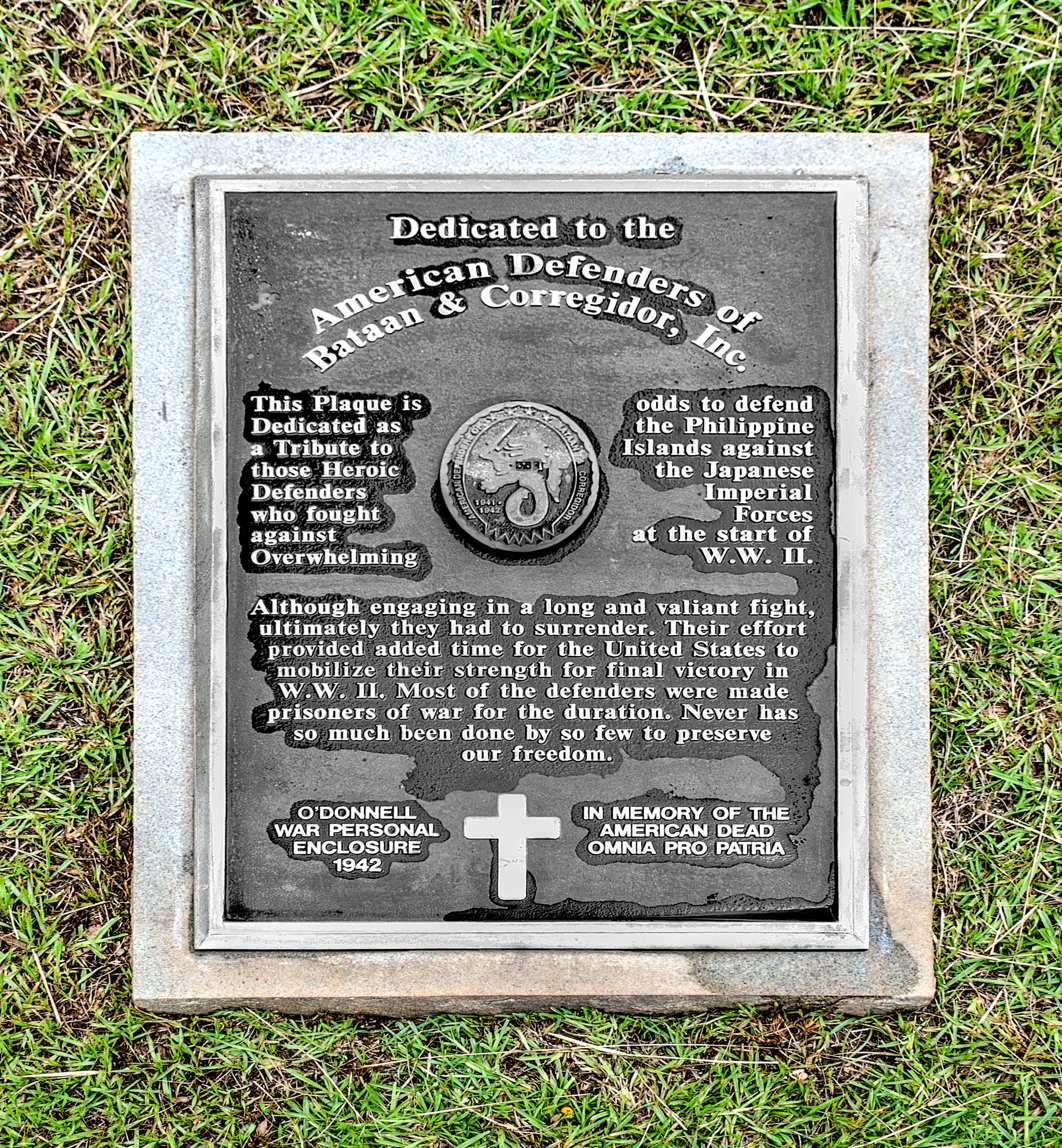
Memorial at Andersonville National Historic Site

During the Battle of the Philippines (1941–42), the Imperial Japanese Army invaded Luzon from the north (at Lingayen Gulf) in early 1942 and attacked Manila from its landward side. American and Filipino troops under the command of General Douglas MacArthur, retreated to the Bataan Peninsula, west of Manila Bay. The fall of Bataan on April 9, 1942, ended all organized opposition by the U.S. Armed Forces in the Far East (USAFFE) and gave way to the invading Japanese forces in Luzon in the northern Philippines. They were forced to surrender due to the lack of food and ammunition, leaving Corregidor and its adjacent islets at Manila Bay as the only areas in the region under U.S. control.

Between December 24, 1941, and February 19, 1942, Corregidor was the temporary location for the Government of the Philippines. On December 30, 1941, outside the Malinta Tunnel, Manuel L. Quezon and Sergio Osmeña were inaugurated respectively as president and vice-president of the Philippines Commonwealth for a second term. General Douglas MacArthur also used Corregidor as Allied headquarters until March 11, 1942. The Voice of Freedom, the radio station of USAFFE broadcast from Corregidor, aired the infamous announcement of the fall of Bataan. In April 1942, one battalion of the Fourth Marines was sent to reinforce the island's beach defenses.

The Battle of Corregidor was the culmination of the Japanese campaign for the conquest of the Philippines. The fortifications across the entrance to Manila Bay were the remaining obstacle for the 14th Area Army of the Imperial Japanese Army led by Lieutenant General Masaharu Homma. American and Filipino soldiers on Corregidor and the neighboring islets held out against the Japanese to deny the use of Manila Bay, but the Imperial Japanese Army brought heavy artillery to the southern end of Bataan, and proceeded north to blockade Corregidor. Japanese troops forced the surrender of the remaining American and Filipino forces on May 6, 1942, under the command of Lieutenant General Jonathan Wainwright.

The battle for the recapture of Corregidor occurred from February 16 to 26, 1945, in which American and Filipino forces successfully recaptured the island fortress from the Japanese occupying forces.

Due to the intense bombing of the island by both the Japanese and American forces, the island was later reforested with seeds dropped by aircraft.

=== Jabidah massacre ===
In 1968, an area near Kindley Airfield at Tailside was the site of the Jabidah massacre, a key event in the history of the Bangsamoro and the Moro people.

In connection with the North Borneo dispute, the President of the Philippines at the time, Ferdinand Marcos, had secretly authorized the execution of Operation Merdeka, in which a secret Moro commando unit code-named "Jabidah" would be trained in Corregidor to destabilize and take over Sabah.

Varying accounts say 18 to 69 recruits, mostly Tausug from Sulu, eventually refused to take orders from their officers - variously explained as due to the non-payment of their salaries or the discovery of the specifics of their final mission, which they found morally unacceptable. The officers then allegedly shot all of the men to death, with only one witness, Jibin Arula, managing to escape by pretending to be dead.

Jibin Arula was rescued by fishermen near Caraballo Island when he attempted to swim to escape, and his account eventually became the subject of numerous trials and hearings. Despite this, the officers implicated in the massacre were never convicted which served as a clear indication to the Muslim community that Marcos' government had little regard for them. This created a furor within the Muslim community in the Philippines, and eventually triggered calls for Moro independence; the rise of separatist movements such as the Muslim Independence Movement, the Moro National Liberation Front, and the Moro Islamic Liberation Front; and the Moro conflict in general. The government of the now-autonomous Bangsamoro Autonomous Region in Muslim Mindanao (BARMM) acknowledges the Jabidah Massacre as a key moment in Bangsamoro history.

In 2015, during a ceremony marking the 47th anniversary of the massacre, a symbolic peace marker: 'Mindanao Garden of Peace: Corregidor Island' was turned over to the families of the survivors of the massacre.

== Fortifications ==
There were 23 batteries installed on Corregidor, consisting of 56 coastal defense guns and mortars. In addition, Corregidor had 13 anti-aircraft artillery batteries with 76 guns (28 3-inch and 48 .50-caliber) and 10 60-inch Sperry searchlights.

The longest-range coastal pieces were the two 12-inch (305 mm) guns of Batteries Hearn and Smith, with a horizontal range of 29,000 yards (27,000 m). Although capable of an all around traverse, these guns, due to their flat trajectories, were not effective for use on defensive perimeter targets on Bataan and Cavite, as their maximum elevation was 35 degrees.

During the siege, the island had ample armor-piercing ammunition but very little of the anti-personnel type, which then was of greatest demand for use against land targets on Bataan. In fact, most of the anti-personnel shells were only for the 12-inch mortars of Batteries Way and Geary.

=== Battery Monja ===
Battery Monja is located on Wheeler Point. It was operated by Battery G of the 92nd Coast Artillery Regiment, Philippine Scouts. The battery had two French 155mm GPF cannon, both of which were hidden in the sides of the island's bluffs. One gun was commanded by 2LT Robert L. Obourn, who claimed that, towards the end of the battle, "You could see the shells wobble towards the [enemy] ships. Our guns were reduced to nothing more than muskets." Obourn's gun was struck and destroyed on April 28, 1942, killing 2 of his gunners. The remaining crew of Battery Monja continued to fight against the Japanese as guerrillas until July 18, 1942. Only 6 men, including Lt. Obourn, survived their capture. The 5 enlisted men that were serving as gunners for the battery attempted to escape from their temporary prison camp two days after capture; they all were killed during their attempted escape.

=== Battery Way ===
Battery Way, named for Lt. Henry N Way, which along with Battery Geary, was the mainstay of the Corregidor Garrison during the Japanese invasion. Its four 12-inch (305 mm) mortars, capable of a 360-degree traverse, could fire on land targets at Bataan. They brought the most destruction on Japanese positions during the attempted landings on the southwest coast of Bataan late in January to the middle of February 1942. These mortars were silenced by enemy shelling in May 1942.

=== Battery Geary ===
Battery Geary was a battery of eight 13-ton, 12-inch (305 mm) mortars. Defiladed in a hollow on Corregidor's Southern coast it was fairly well protected from Japanese shelling. On January 6, 1942, while under the command of Capt. Ben Ewing King, a Japanese bomb landed in a makeshift temporary bunker killing 31 of Battery Geary's NCOs and canoneers.

Early in the morning of January 26 Battery Geary opened fire on a unit of Japanese soldiers near Longaskawayan Point on the west side of the Bataan Peninsula during the Battle of the Points. This was the first time fixed coastal artillery had fired at an enemy since the close of the Civil War. Although the fire was considered accurate and effective, Col. Bunker decided to replace Capt. King and he was sent to perform the duties of fort XO and to command HQ Battery on Ft. Drum. He was replaced at Battery Geary by Capt. Thomas W. Davis. Later, this battery was pinpointed by the Japanese artillery and was subjected to heavy shelling. One direct hit by a 240-mm shell, which detonated the magazines of this battery on May 2, 1942, proved to be the most crippling shot during the entire siege of Corregidor. This explosion tossed the fifty ton barrel of the mortar around, one to a distance of 150 yards (140 m), another was blown through three feet of reinforced concrete wall into the adjoining powder magazine of Battery Crockett. Large chunks of steel were blown as far as the Malinta Tunnel, killing 27 of the battery crew instantly. Also, one mortar still had a live round in its breech, and it was in the process of firing the shell when the magazine was hit. That live anti-personnel round still lies within the breach of the mortar.

== Corregidor today ==
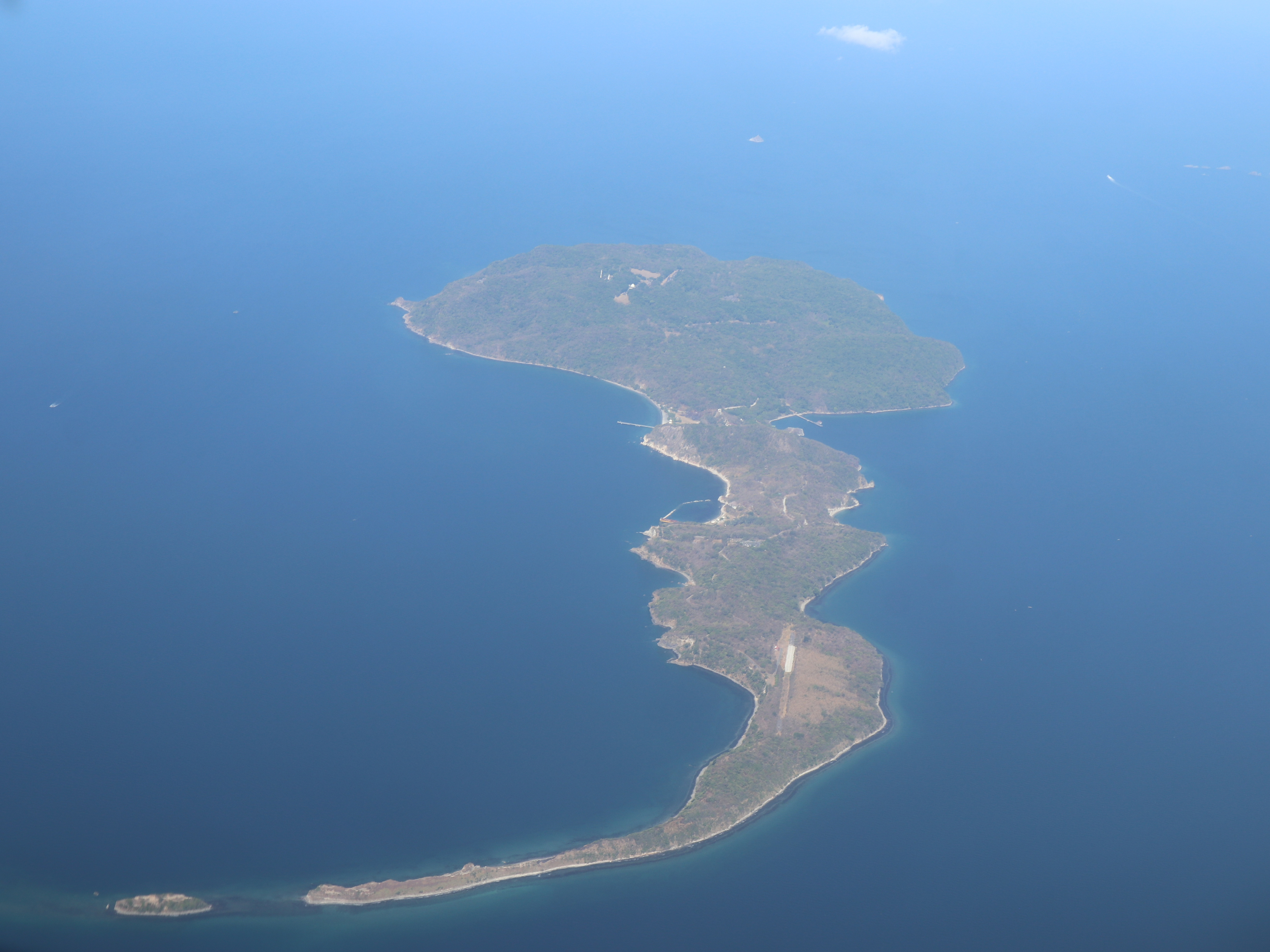
Aerial view of the island in 2024

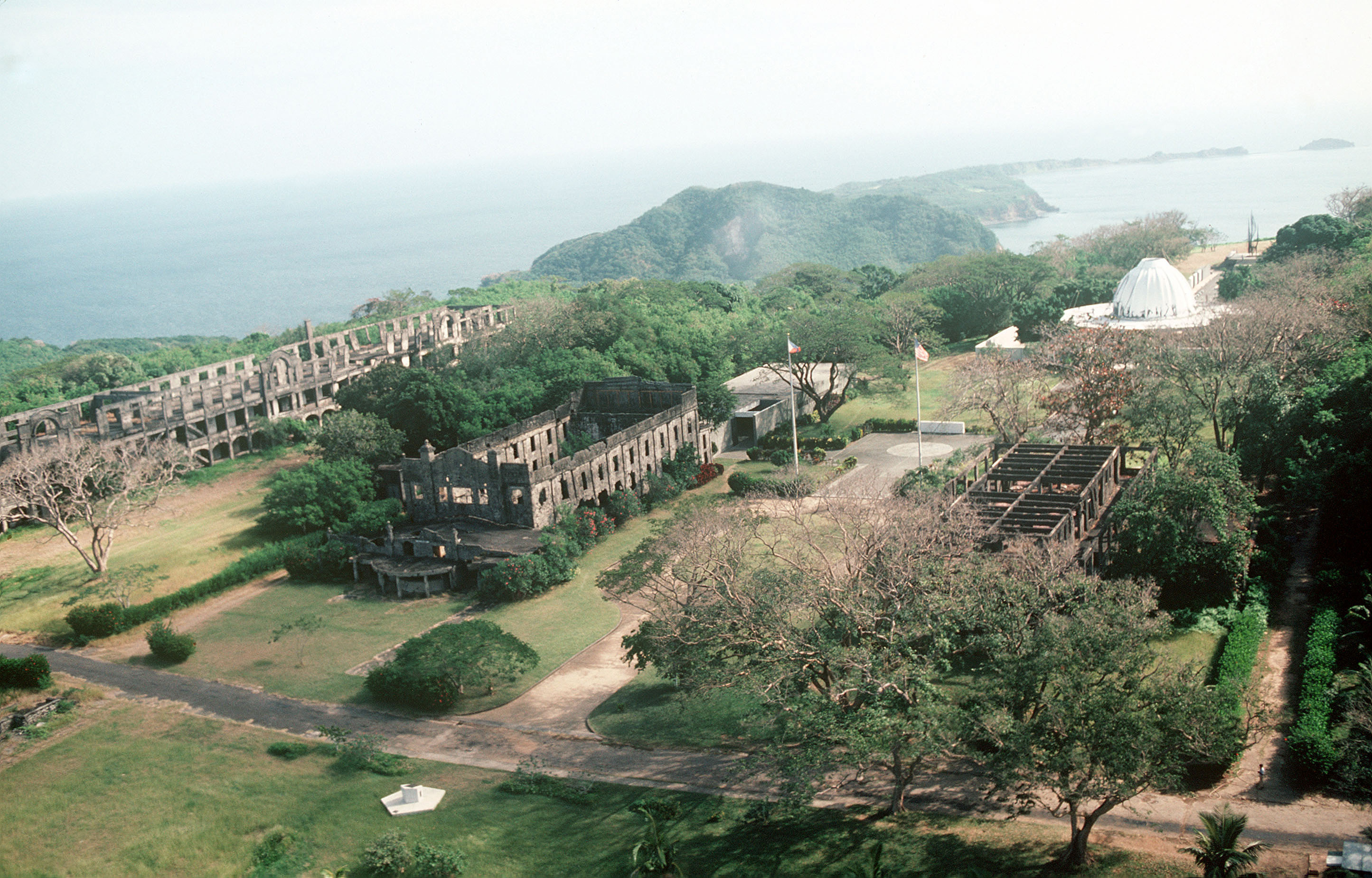
Aerial view of the ruins

After the war, many people, most of them veterans, visited the island because of its history. Today, Corregidor is a historic monument as well as a tourist destination. Many travel companies offer day tours on the island featuring military installations used during World War II. Most of the war-ravaged buildings have not been restored, and left as they were after the war in reverence to the Filipino and American soldiers who died there.

=== Pacific War Memorial ===
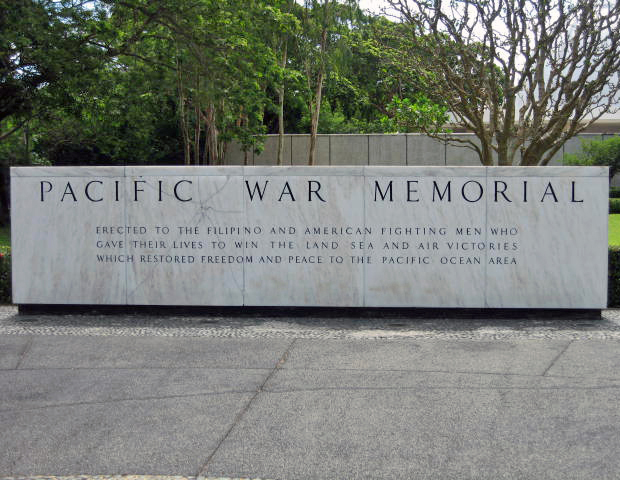
Marker of the Pacific War Memorial

Standing on the highest part of Corregidor's Topside is the Pacific War Memorial, which was built by the United States Government to honor the Filipino and American soldiers who participated in World War II. It was completed in 1968 at the cost of three million dollars. The major memorial structure is a rotunda with a circular altar directly under the dome's oculus through which light falls on the altar during daylight hours. Light lands directly on the altar on May 5 at exactly 12 noon, in commemoration of the surrender of the troops stationed there and the courage they exhibited over 72 days of bombing. Located behind the Memorial is the Eternal Flame of Freedom, a 40 feet (12 m) Corten steel structure commissioned to Aristides Demetrios symbolizing freedom.

=== Malinta Tunnel ===
The Malinta Tunnel, which is the last stronghold of the joint Philippine and American military prior to the Japanese takeover during the World War II, is now home to an audio-visual presentation by National Artist Lamberto V. Avellana of the events that took place on the island, including the reluctant departure of General Douglas MacArthur and the evacuation of the Philippine president Manuel L. Quezon and his family to unoccupied areas of the Philippines and eventually in exile in the United States.

In recent years, post-pandemic, the audio-presentation is no longer operational. The tour through Malinta Tunnel still contains statues used in the presentation, but the lights and audio are defunct.

=== Filipino Heroes Memorial ===
One of the most recent additions to Corregidor is the Filipino Heroes Memorial located in the Tail End. This 6,000-square-meter (65,000 sq ft) complex has 14 murals depicting heroic battles fought by Filipinos from the 15th century up to the present day. It was designed by Francisco Mañosa, while the murals and a statue of a Filipino guerrilla were sculpted by Manuel Casas. The complex was inaugurated by President Fidel V. Ramos on August 28, 1992.

=== Japanese Garden of Peace ===
This garden was built as a memorial to the Japanese soldiers who served and died on the island during World War II. The park includes a praying area, shrines, markers and a small pavilion that houses photographs and memorabilia. Additionally, there are mounted Japanese guns collected from around the island and brought to the field.

The garden was built near the Japanese military cemetery, which was lost until a photograph of the site was recovered and used to trace its location.

=== Corregidor lighthouse ===
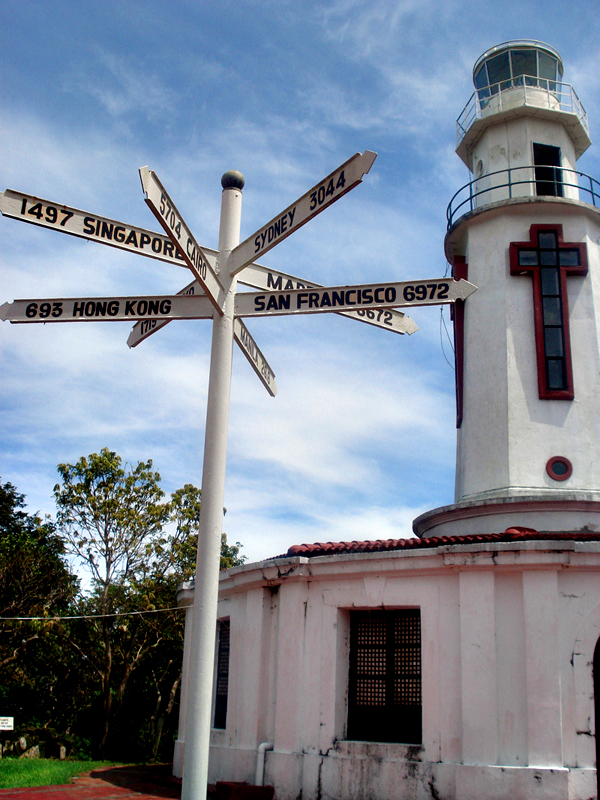
The Corregidor lighthouse in 2011

The lighthouse on Topside is one of the oldest landmarks in Corregidor, first lit in 1853. In 1897, the defective lighting apparatus was changed, extending the range to 33 miles (53 km). The grounds and keeper's dwellings were further improved during the American occupation. During World War II, the lighthouse was damaged during the siege of Corregidor. The lighthouse was totally reconstructed in the 1950s with a different design, on the same spot as the first lighthouse. The whole lantern of the lighthouse was recently replaced by the Philippine Coast Guard to run on solar power.

=== Texas A&M University monument ===
See also: Muster (Texas A&M University)

In 2015, a monument designed by students at the School of Architecture at Texas A&M University in College Station, Texas was dedicated. During World War II, there were more officers from Texas A&M – the largest of the United States' six senior military colleges and known during World War II as the Agricultural and Mechanical College of Texas – than from any other school and more than the combined total of the United States Military Academy and the United States Naval Academy.

In 1942, Brigadier General George F. Moore, a 1908 graduate of Texas A&M, was the American artillery commander on Corregidor. With the help of Major Tom Dooley, of A&M's class of 1935, Moore gathered the names of 25 other Aggies – as the students, alumni and athletic teams of the university are known – under his command. Despite the fierce fighting as the Japanese laid siege to the island, on April 21, 1942, Moore held a muster, or military roll call, calling the names of each of the Aggies under his command. In 1889, Texas A&M administrators had declared that April 21 – San Jacinto Day in Texas, the anniversary of the Battle of San Jacinto whereby Texas gained its independence from Mexico – would be a school holiday. It had evolved, including with the support of former school president William Bizzell in 1919, into a day for current students and alumni to gather wherever they were.

Only 12 of the 25 survived the battle and the prisoner of war camps to which the survivors were sent. Dooley told a United Press correspondent about the gathering, and the reporter sent an article back to the United States about the 25 Aggies who had "Mustered". Although the Aggies on Corregidor did not physically gather for Muster, stories were widely published celebrating their heroic assembly in the Malinta Tunnel including yelling and singing of songs about Texan independence.

In 1943, one year after the Aggies' original Corregidor Muster, E. E. McQuillen, Executive Secretary of the school's alumni association, The Association of Former Students, renamed the school's April 21 event Aggie Muster. This is also when it began to evolve into how it is known today, when students and alumni also honor fellow Aggies who have died. Dr. John Ashton of A&M's class of 1906 also wrote a poem in 1943 at McQuillen's request. Entitled "The Heroes' Roll Call", also known as the "Roll Call for the Absent" (which is also the name of a current Aggie Muster traditional segment), it also commemorates the 1942 Muster and is designed so that the number of years since 1942 can be inserted.

In April 1945, eight weeks after Corregidor was recaptured, three Aggies "Mustered on the Rock" and wrote letters to McQuillen detailing the events. On April 21, 1946 – the first such day after the war – 128 Aggies gathered on the island for Muster and to remember their fallen comrades. They posed for a photograph at the mouth of the Malinta Tunnel with an improvised A&M flag made from a bed sheet, and the photograph became famous. MacArthur also wrote a message to Texas A&M that day praising the bravery of Aggies who had given their lives on Corregidor and elswehere.

Efforts by the university to memorialize student and alumni participation during World War II in the Philippines began in 2011 when The Association of Former Students asked Elton Abbott, assistant dean for International Programs and Initiatives for the College of Architecture, to enlist the college's resources to design a Corregidor monument. The Association of Former Students then secured funds from Texas A&M Clubs and private donors to build the monument.

Affixed to the largest of the monument's four ceramic-tiled panels in maroon, the school's color, is a large bronze Aggie Muster symbol with a crossed rifle and sword over a lit torch and partially obscured “A&M” letters. A bronze plaque below describes the famous 1942 and 1946 Aggie Musters. The monument descends to the left in three tall “steps,” each with plaques mounted on top. The center plaque names the 88 Aggies who defended Corregidor and Bataan, the right plaque names the 1942 Muster participants, and the left plaque names the 1946 Muster participants. The American and Philippine flags fly over the monument along with the Texas A&M flag.

== Notable people ==
- Selma Calmes, anesthesiologist, was born in Corregidor.

== See also ==
- List of islands in the Greater Manila Area
- List of islands of the Philippines
- Fort Drum (El Fraile Island)
