= Mentor (ship) =

Several ships have been named Mentor:

- Mentor (1776 ship) was launched in Philadelphia in 1758 under another name. For some time her name was British King. By the time she first appeared in Lloyd's Register (LR) in 1776 her name had become Mentor. From 1776 to 1790 she was a Greenland whaler, though she also spent time trading generally, and as a transport. In 1791 she commenced a voyage to the Southern Whale Fishery but received damage en route and was condemned at the River Plate.
- Mentor (1778 ship) was launched in 1778 at Chester as a West Indiaman. She captured three vessels, including a valuable East Indiaman belonging to the French East India Company. She had an inconclusive single ship action with a French warship in 1779. She was wrecked in 1782.
- Mentor (1781 ship) was launched in New England. From 1784 she sailed from Great Britain, trading between London and New York or Quebec. From 1789 she made three complete voyages as a whaler in the British Southern Whale Fishery. The French Navy captured her in early 1795 as she was returning from her fourth whaling voyage.
- Mentor (1784 ship) was the former HMS Wasp, launched in 1749. The British Royal Navy sold Wasp in 1781 and she became the mercantile Polly, which traded with Africa. In 1784 Polly became the slave ship Mentor. Mentor made eight voyages carrying enslaved people from The Gambia to the West Indies. French privateers captured her in late 1795 as she was on her way from West Africa to the West Indies on her ninth voyage.
- Mentor (1792 ship) was a snow launched in 1792 at Wemyss that the Admiralty hired from 1793 to 1801 for service as a hired armed vessel. The Navy released her from her contract at the end of 1801 after the signing of the Treaty of Amiens. She then returned to mercantile service, sailing first to Hamburg and then Oporto. She became a coaster on England's east coast, or a Baltic trader. She was last listed in 1832.
- Mentor (1799 ship) was a Spanish prize captured in 1799. She made one voyage transporting enslaved people and foundered on her way back to Liverpool after delivering her captives.
- Mentor, a brig that sank while carrying antiquities that Lord Elgin had bought.
- Mentor (1801 ship), of 179 tons burthen, was a brigantine (later brig), built by Thomas Walmsley in North Shields. She was lost in February 1832 in the North Sea.

== See also ==
- HMS Mentor – one of several vessels or shore installations of the British Royal Navy
