= Spanish ship Santisima Trinidad =

Santísima Trinidad was the name of several Spanish ships:

- Spanish ship Santísima Trinidad (1751), the largest of the Manila galleons
- Spanish ship Nuestra Señora de la Santísima Trinidad, a first-rate ship of the line officially named Santísima Trinidad in 1768; launched in 1769; captured at the Battle of Trafalgar, but later sank in a storm
