= Caballo Island =

Island in Philippines

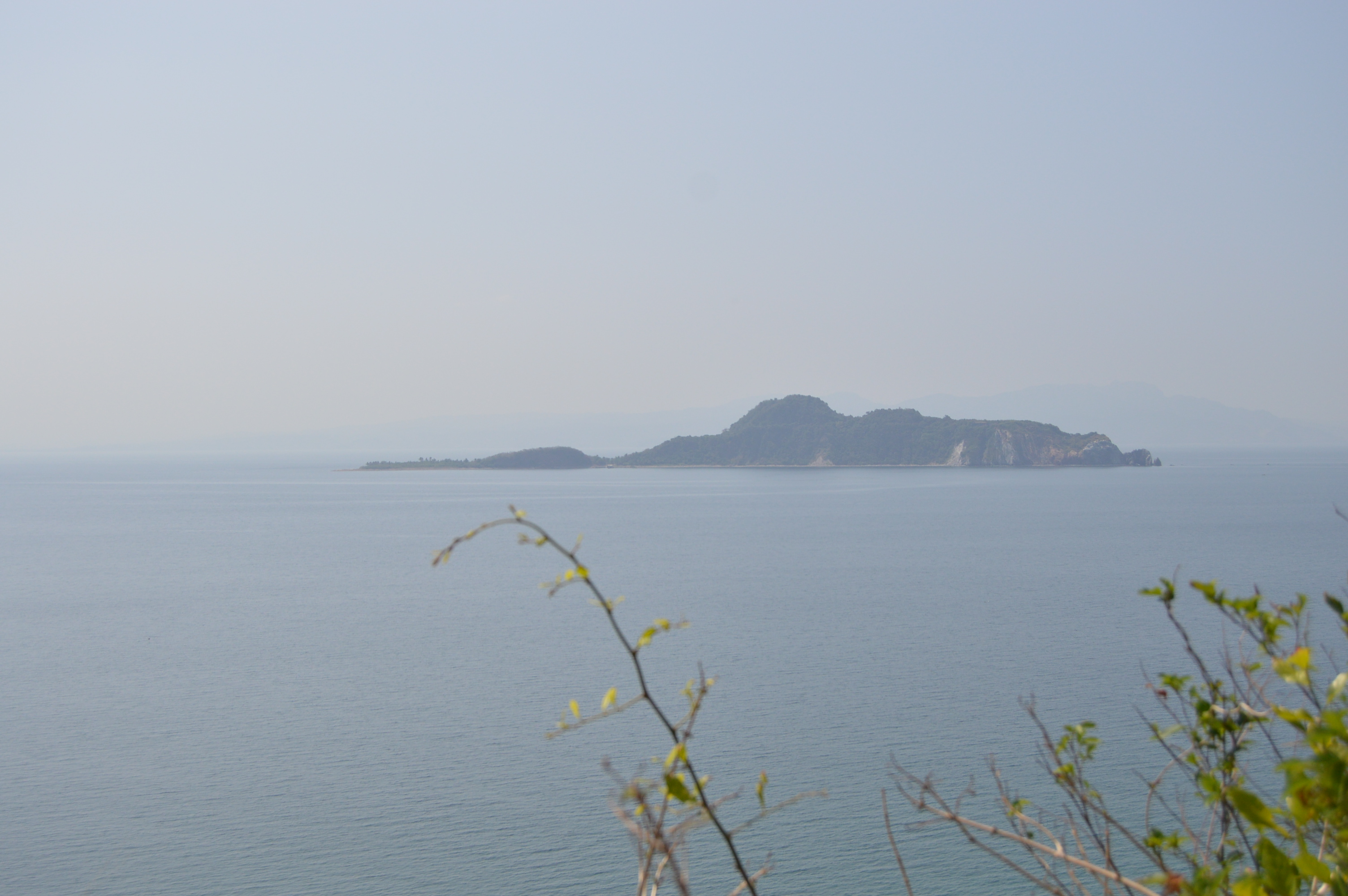
- Caballo Island, as seen from Corregidor Island in March 2019

Geography
- Location: Manila Bay
- Coordinates: 14°22′N 120°37′E
- Length: 1.21 km (0.752 mi)
- Width: 0.32 km (0.199 mi)
- Highest elevation: 116 m (381 ft)

Administration
- Philippines
- Region: Calabarzon
- Province: Cavite
- City: Cavite City

Additional information
- Official website: Fort Hughes

Caballo Island (which means "Horse Island" in Spanish) is a bluff, rocky island located at the entrance to Manila Bay in the Philippines. It is about 1.2 km (0.75 mi) long with the highest elevation at 381 feet high. Caballo, along with the larger Corregidor (2 km to the north), divides the entrance to the bay into two broad and deep channels, known as the North and South Channel.

The whole island was formerly occupied by Fort Hughes, a U.S. defense fortification before World War II. It was heavily bombed during the war.

== Geological history ==
Caballo and Corregidor Islands are believed to be the rims of the Corregidor Caldera. The gap between the two islands is only about 1/4 mile with a depth of 7 fathoms (42 feet; 13 meters) and is never used for large vessel navigation.

In November 2014, Filipino peacekeepers from Liberia who were quarantined on the island for 21 days due to concerns about Ebola were cleared to return to the mainland. At that time West Africa was having an outbreak of the disease.

== Current tenants ==
The island — as of 2010 — was occupied by the Philippine Navy and is off limits to civilians. Remains of the old fortifications, batteries and structures have been abandoned and left rusting in the open after World War II.

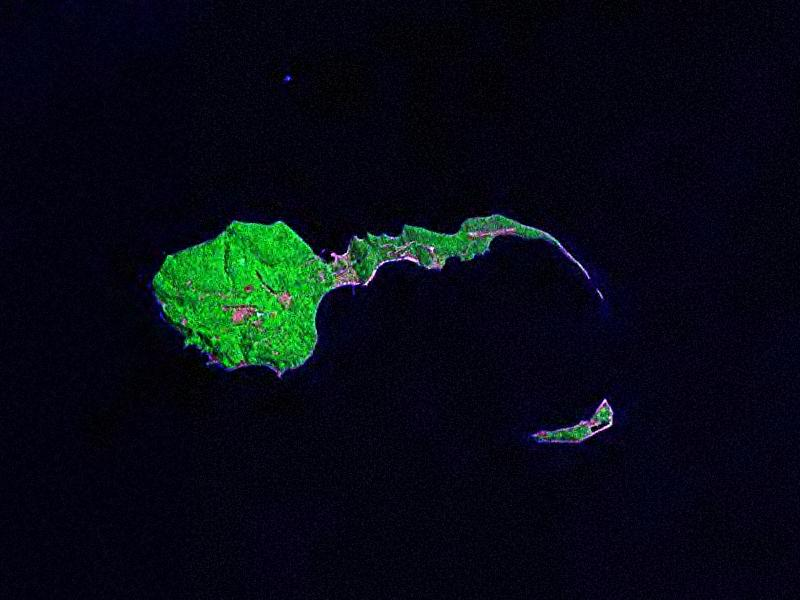
Caballo Island (bottom) and the larger Corregidor Island (top)

== See also ==
- List of islands in the Greater Manila Area
- List of islands of the Philippines
- Manila Bay
