= HMS Mentor =

At least four ships of the Royal Navy have borne the name HMS Mentor:

- HMS Mentor (1780) was an armed ship of unknown name and 24-guns that the British Royal Navy captured from the Americans in 1778, and that purchasers converted to the Liverpool privateer Who's Afraid. Sir Peter Parker purchased her at Jamaica in 1780 and renamed her HMS Mentor; she was burnt in 1781 during the Siege of Pensacola to prevent the Spanish from capturing her.
- HMS Mentor (1781) was an 18-gun sloop, the former Massachusetts privateer Aurora, which HMS Royal Oak captured on 10 July 1781; Mentor foundered off Bermuda after 16 March 1783 with the loss of all hands, including the men she had rescued from HMS Cerberus.
- HMS Mentor (1914) was an Hawthorn M-class destroyer launched in 1914. She served on the First Ostend Raid and the Battle of Dogger Bank (1915); she was broken up in 1922.
- HMS Mentor (1981) was a tender, sold in 1992.

During World War II, the Ministry of Defence took over Lews Castle as accommodation for the air and ground crew of 700 Naval Air Squadron. The squadron operated a detachment of six Supermarine Walrus aircraft from a slipway at Cuddy Point in the Grounds. The base was referred to as HMS Mentor.

== Hired armed vessels ==
- From 1794 to 1798, the Admiralty employed the armed ship Mentor.
- From 1793 to 1801 the Admiralty employed the hired armed vessel Mentor, a snow launched in 1792, of 19376/94 tons (bm), armed with ten 4-pounder guns.
