= HMS Seaford =

Four ships of the Royal Navy have borne the name HMS Seaford, after the coastal town of Seaford, now in East Sussex. A fifth was planned, but was not completed for the navy:

- HMS Seaford (1695) was a 24-gun sixth rate purchased in 1695 and captured by the French in 1697.
- HMS Seaford (1697) was a 24-gun sixth rate launched in 1697, rebuilt in 1724 and broken up in 1740.
- HMS Seaford (1741) was a 24-gun sixth rate launched in 1741 and broken up by 1754.
- HMS Seaford (1754) was a 20-gun sixth rate launched in 1754, participated in the Battle of Manila (1762), and sold in 1784.
- HMS Seaford was to have been a Bangor-class minesweeper. She was laid down in 1941, renamed HMS Waglan later that year, and captured while under construction by the Japanese during the Fall of Hong Kong in late 1941. She was completed by them and launched as 102. Returned to the Royal Navy in 1947, she was scrapped in 1948.
