= Corregidor Caldera =

Extinct volcanic caldera

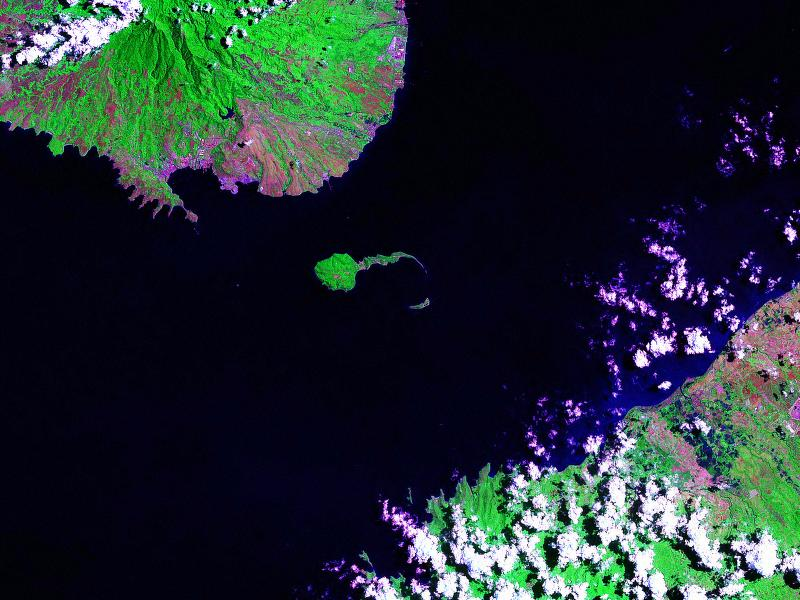
- Corregidor and Caballo Islands are the rim of the caldera

Highest point
- Elevation: 173 m (568 ft)
- Prominence: 173 m (568 ft)
- Listing: Potentially-active volcanoes of the Philippines
- Coordinates: 14°22′39″N 120°36′33″E

Geography
- Location within Philippines
- Location: Entrance to Manila Bay

Geology
- Mountain type: Caldera
- Volcanic zone: Western Bataan Lineament
- Last eruption: Pleistocene

Corregidor Caldera is an extinct volcanic caldera located at the entrance to Manila Bay in the Philippines. The caldera is composed of the islands of Corregidor and Caballo in the province of Cavite, which are believed to be the exposed rim of the volcano.

== Physical features ==
Corregidor is classified by Philippine volcanologists as a potentially-active caldera with a rim elevation of 173 meters (568 ft) and a base diameter of 4 kilometers (2.5 mi).

Predominant rock type is dacite with a 72.68% silica dioxide content.

== Eruption ==
Last eruption was about 1 million years (1.10 +/-0.09 Ma) BP based on the age of deposits.

== Listings ==
The Philippine Institute of Volcanology and Seismology (PHIVOLCS) lists the volcano as potentially active. The reason for this listing rather than inactive, is not disclosed on the PHIVOLCS website listing.

Corregidor is not listed with the Smithsonian Institution's Global Volcanism Program as it has no known eruptions in the Holocene epoch (around 10,000 years ago).

== See also ==
- List of volcanoes in the Philippines
