= HMS Firm (1759) =

Ship of the line of the Royal Navy

History

Great Britain
- Name: HMS Firm
- Ordered: 11 August 1756
- Builder: Perry, Blackwall Yard
- Launched: 15 January 1759
- Fate: Sold out of the service, 1791
- Notes: Harbour service from 1784

General characteristics
- Class & type: Edgar-class ship of the line
- Tons burthen: 1297 tons
- Length: 154 ft (47 m) (gundeck)
- Beam: 43 ft 6 in (13.26 m)
- Depth of hold: 18 ft 4 in (5.59 m)
- Propulsion: Sails
- Sail plan: Full-rigged ship
- Armament: 60 guns: Gundeck: 24 × 24 pdrs; Upper gundeck: 26 × 12 pdrs; Quarterdeck: 8 × 6 pdrs; Forecastle: 2 × 6 pdrs

HMS Firm was a 60-gun fourth rate ship of the line of the Royal Navy, launched on 15 January 1759 at Blackwall Yard, London.

Her carpenter from 1775 was James Wallis, who had previously served aboard HMS Resolution with Captain James Cook on his second voyage to the Pacific.

She was on harbour service from 1784, and was broken up in 1791.
