= Battle of Manila (1762) =

Part of the Seven Years' War

- Part of the Anglo-Spanish War (1762–1763)
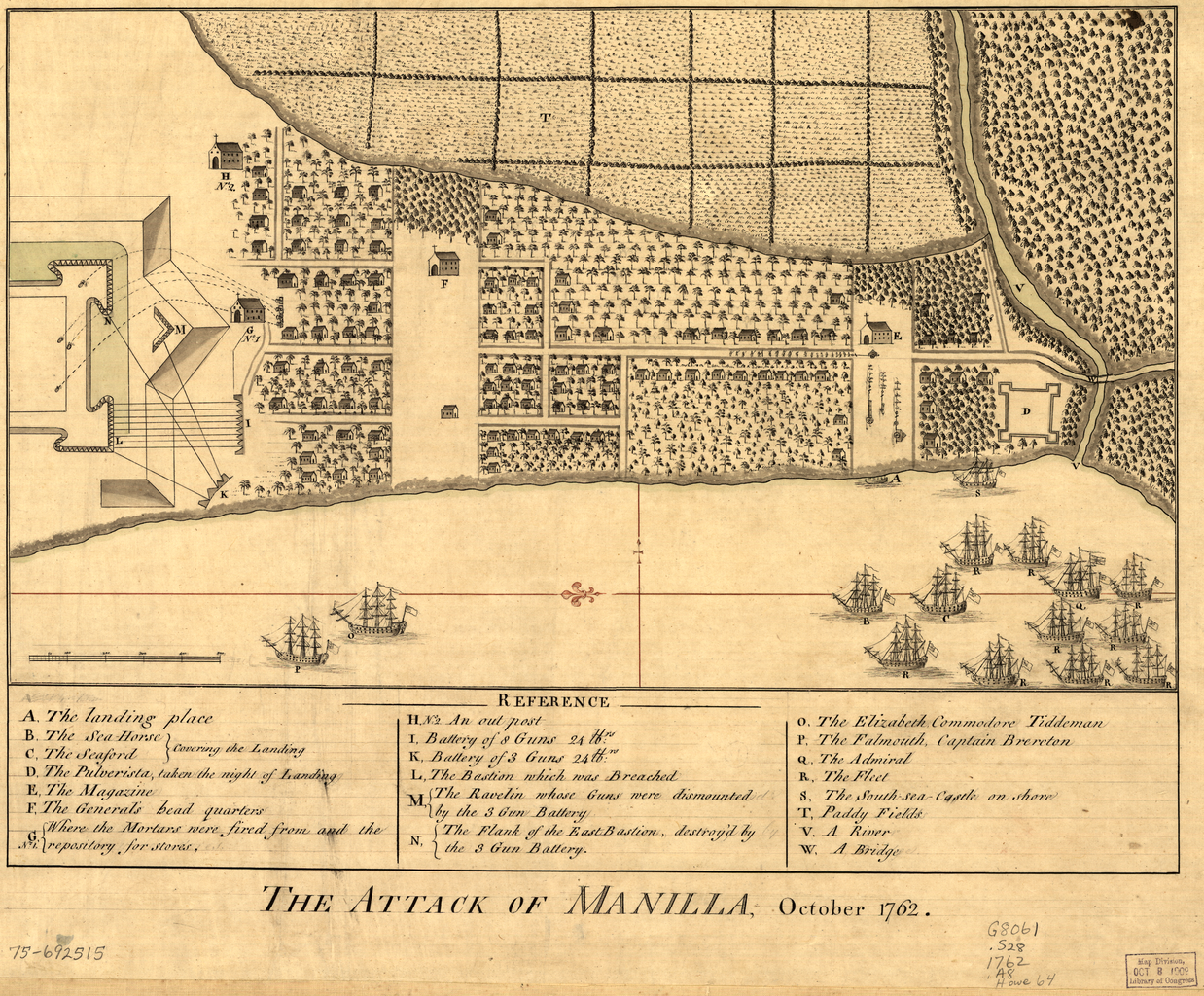
- Map depicting where the British landed in Manila with the assault from the south
Date	24 September – 6 October 1762
Location	Manila, Philippines 14°34′48″N 120°58′39″E
Result	British victory

Belligerents
Great Britain	Spain

Commanders and leaders
William Draper; Samuel Cornish	Manuel Rojo; Simón y Salazar

Strength
10,300; 8 ships of the line; 3 frigates; 4 store ships	9,356

Casualties and losses
147 killed or wounded	100 killed or wounded; 9,256 captured; 556 cannons and mortars; 300 Filipino soldiers killed

The Battle of Manila was fought during the Seven Years' War, from 24 September 1762 to 6 October 1762, between the Kingdom of Great Britain and the Kingdom of Spain in and around Manila, the capital of the Philippines, a Spanish colony at that time. The British won, leading to an eighteen-month occupation of Manila.

== Background ==
The British Ministry approved Colonel Draper's plans to invade the Philippines, and HMS Seahorse, under Captain Cathcart Grant, was sent to intercept Manila-bound vessels. The first portion of the invasion fleet sailed from India on 21 July, under Commodore Richard Tiddeman in HMS Elizabeth, followed by the remainder under Vice-Admiral Sir Samuel Cornish, 1st Baronet on 1 August. HMS Norfolk (of 74 guns) served as the vice-admiral's flagship. The other ships of the line were the Elizabeth (64 guns), HMS Lenox (74), HMS Grafton (68), HMS Weymouth (60), HMS America (60), HMS Panther (60) and HMS Falmouth (50), while there were also three frigates – HMS Argo (28), HMS Seahorse (20), and HMS Seaford (20) – and the storeship HMS Southsea Castle. They carried a force of 6,839 regulars, sailors and marines. The commander of the land forces of the expedition was Brigadier-General William Draper. He was assisted by Colonel Monson as second-in-command, Major Scott as adjutant-general, and Captain Fletcher as brigade-major of the East India Company. The expeditionary force consisted of the 79th Regiment of Foot, a Royal Artillery company, 29 artillerymen, and 610 sepoys of the Presidency armies, along with 365 irregulars.

Manila was garrisoned by the Life Guard of the Governor-General of the Philippines, the 2nd Battalion of the King's regiment under Don Miguel de Valdez, Spanish marines, a corps of artillery under Lt. Gen. Don Felix de Eguilux, seconded by Brig. the Marquis de Villa Medina, a company of Pampangos, and a company of cadets.

== Battle ==
Vice Admiral Cornish's fleet, twelve vessels, of which eight carried more than fifty guns apiece, anchored in Manila Bay on 23 September. A landing was planned two miles south of the city, covered by the three frigates HMS Argo, under Captain Richard King, HMS Seahorse, under Captain Charles Cathcart Grant, and HMS Seaford under Captain John Pelghin. The three-pronged landing force of 274 marines was led by Colonel Draper (center), Major More (right), and Colonel Monson (left). The next day, they were joined by 632 seamen under Captains Collins, Pitchford, and Ouvry.

Fort Polverina was captured on 25 September. Further reconnaissance revealed that the fortifications of Manila were incomplete and unformidable. "In many places the ditch had never been finished, the covered way was out of repair, the glacis was too low, some of the outworks were without cannon..."

On 30 September, a British storeship arrived with entrenching tools but was driven ashore by a gale. She had run aground so that she screened the rear of Draper's camp from a large force of Filipinos. Her stores were landed with greater speed and safety than would have been possible had she remained afloat, for the gale continued for several days and forbade the passage of boats through the surf.

A strong gale started on 1 October, cutting off communication with the British fleet. On the morning of 4 October, a force of 1,000 local Pampangos attacked a recently built cantonment but was beaten back with 300 casualties. After this failure, all except 1,800 of the Pampangos abandoned the city. "The fire from the garrison now became faint, while that of the besiegers was stronger than ever, and ere long a breach became practicable." On 6 October, 60 volunteers under Lieutenant Russell advanced through the breach in the Bastion of St. Andrew. Engineers and pioneers followed, then came Colonel Monson and Major More with two divisions of the 79th, the seamen, and then another division of the 79th.

Preventing further casualties on both sides (following his Catholic beliefs), acting Governor-General Archbishop Manuel Rojo del Rio y Vieyra surrendered both Manila and Cavite to Draper and Cornish.

== Aftermath ==
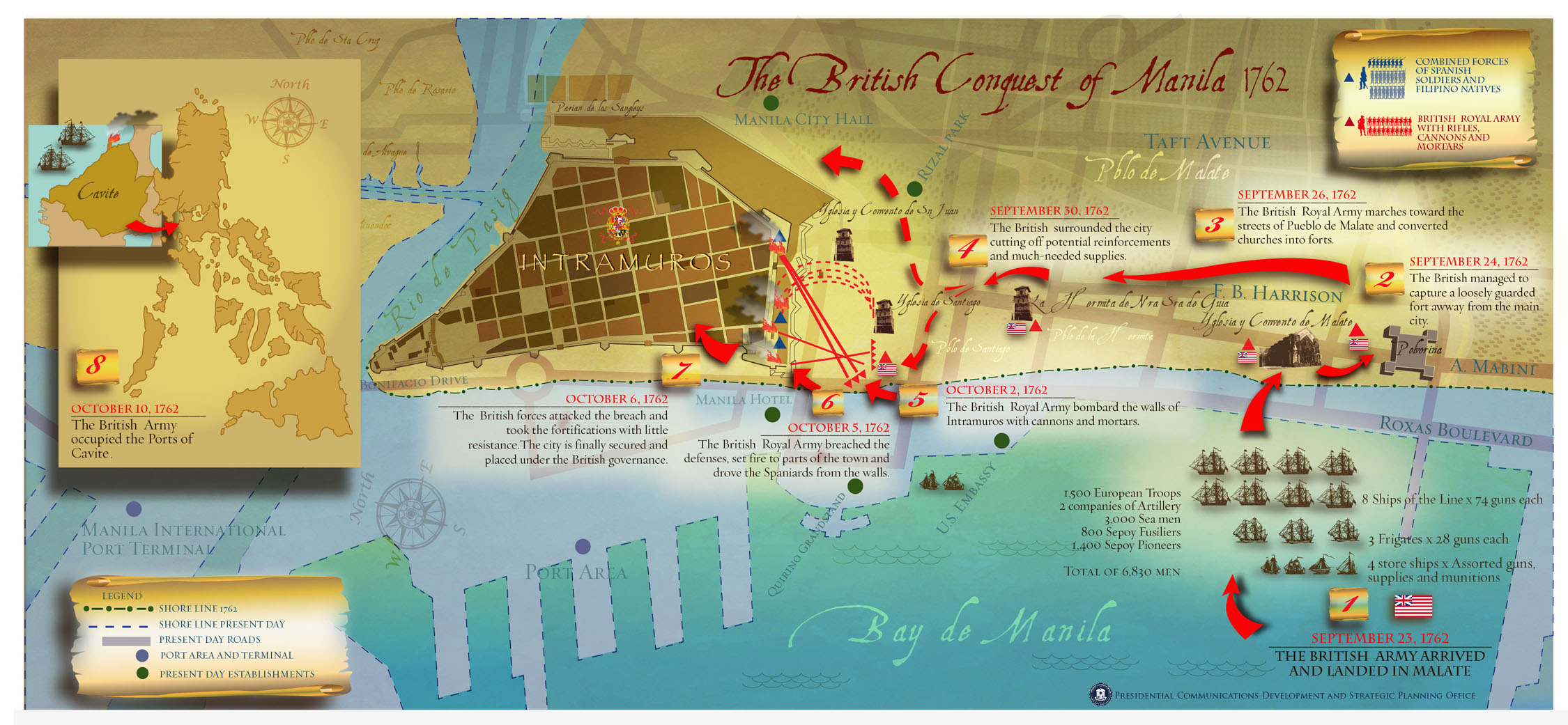
Map of the British conquest of Manila in 1762

Manila was placed under the authority of civilian Deputy Governor Dawsonne Drake, appointed by the East India Company as the leader of the Manila Council. Major Fell commanded the garrison as another member of the council

The British occupation of Manila lasted 18 months until the city was returned to Spain in April 1764 according to the 1763 Treaty of Paris. News that it had been lost did not reach Spain until after the cessation of hostilities between the two powers. Oidor Don Simon Anda y Salazar had been dispatched to Bulacan in order to organize Spanish resistance. There, he organized an army of 10,000 Filipinos under the command of Jose Busto in Pinagbakahan, Malolos.

During their time in the Philippines, the British found themselves confined to Manila and Cavite in a deteriorating situation, unable to extend British control over the islands and unable to make good their promised support for an uprising led first by Diego Silang and later by his wife Gabriela, which was crushed by Spanish forces.

The British expedition was rewarded after the capture of the treasure ship Filipina, carrying American silver from Acapulco, and in the action of 30 October 1762 the Spanish ship Santísima Trinidad which carried goods from China bound for Spain. The ship's capture made both Admiral Cornish and General Draper wealthy enough to retire back home on the prize money alone.

Parliament thanked Draper and Cornish on 19 April 1763. Cornish was made a baronet of Great Britain, and Draper eventually received a Knighthood of the Bath.

== See also ==
- List of India-related topics in the Philippines
- Military history of the Philippines
