= HMS Argo (1758) =

Coventry-class Royal Navy frigate

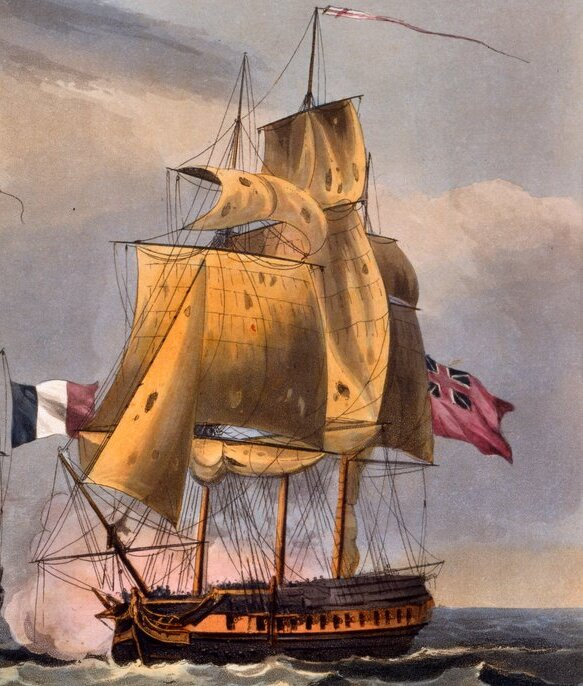
- Argo was built to the same design as HMS Carysfort, (pictured)

History

Great Britain
- Name: HMS Argo
- Ordered: 19 September 1757
- Builder: Henry Bird, Rotherhithe
- Laid down: 22 September 1757
- Launched: 20 July 1758
- Completed: 29 January 1759 at Deptford Dockyard
- Commissioned: October 1758
- Fate: Broken up at Portsmouth November 1776

General characteristics
- Class & type: Coventry-class sixth-rate frigate
- Tons burthen: 601 59/94 bm
- Length: 118 ft 5.75 in (36.1 m) (gundeck); 98 ft 0 in (29.9 m) (keel)
- Beam: 33 ft 11.5 in (10.351 m)
- Depth of hold: 10 ft 6 in (3.20 m)
- Sail plan: Full-rigged ship
- Complement: 200
- Armament: Upper deck: 24 × 9-pounder guns; Quarterdeck: 4 × 3-pounder guns; 12 × 1/2-pounder swivels

HMS Argo was a 28-gun sixth-rate frigate of the Royal Navy. The ship was one of the Coventry class, designed by Sir Thomas Slade as a development of based on HMS Lyme, "with such alterations as may tend to the better stowing of men and carrying for guns."

== Construction ==
Plan of Argo

Argo was a 28-gun sixth-rate, one of 19 vessels forming part of the Coventry class of frigates. As with others in her class she was loosely modeled on the design and dimensions of HMS Tartar, launched in 1756 and responsible for capturing five French privateers in her first twelve months at sea.

The frigate was named after the Argo, the ship from Greek mythology upon which Jason and the Argonauts sailed from Iolcos to Colchis to retrieve the Golden Fleece. The Navy's choice of this name followed a trend initiated in 1748 by John Montagu, 4th Earl of Sandwich, in his capacity as First Sea Lord, of using figures from classical antiquity as descriptors for naval vessels. A total of six Coventry-class vessels were named in this manner; a further ten were named after geographic features including regions, English or Irish rivers, or towns. (Note: The three exceptions to these naming conventions were Hussar, Active and the final vessel in the class, Hind)

In sailing qualities Argo was broadly comparable with French frigates of equivalent size, but with a shorter and sturdier hull and greater weight in her broadside guns. She was also comparatively broad-beamed with ample space for provisions and the ship's mess, and incorporating a large magazine for powder and round shot. (Note: Argo's dimensional ratios 3.57:1 in length to breadth, and 3.3:1 in breadth to depth, compare with standard French equivalents of up to 3.8:1 and 3:1 respectively. Royal Navy vessels of equivalent size and design to Argo were capable of carrying up to 20 tons of powder and shot, compared with a standard French capacity of around 10 tons. They also carried greater stores of rigging, spars, sails and cables, but had fewer ship's boats and less space for the possessions of the crew.) Taken together, these characteristics would enable Argo to remain at sea for long periods without resupply. She was also built with broad and heavy masts, which balanced the weight of her hull, improved stability in rough weather and made her capable of carrying a greater quantity of sail. The disadvantages of this comparatively heavy design were a decline in manoeuvrability and slower speed when sailing in light winds.

Her designated complement was 200, comprising two commissioned officers – a captain and a lieutenant – overseeing 40 warrant and petty officers, 91 naval ratings, 38 Marines and 29 servants and other ranks. (Note: The 29 servants and other ranks provided for in the ship's complement consisted of 20 personal servants and clerical staff, four assistant carpenters an assistant sailmaker and four widow's men. Unlike naval ratings, servants and other ranks took no part in the sailing or handling of the ship.) Among these other ranks were four positions reserved for widow's men – fictitious crew members whose pay was intended to be reallocated to the families of sailors who died at sea.

== Naval career ==
Argo was commissioned into the Royal Navy in October 1758, during Britain's Seven Years' War with France and Spain. After receiving stores, guns and crew she was out to sea in late January 1759 under the command of Captain John Tinker, and was assigned to the British squadron blockading the French-held port of Dunkirk. Tinker departed the vessel in July 1759 and was replaced by a more junior officer, Commander Walter Griffith.

She took part in the expedition against Manila. In a two-hour action on 31 October 1762, Argo and the Edgar-class fourth-rate 60-gun HMS Panther captured the Spanish galleon Santísima Trinidad, loaded with cargo valued at $1.5 million.
