= Action of 30 October 1762 =

1762 battle of the Anglo-Spanish War

- Part of the Anglo-Spanish War
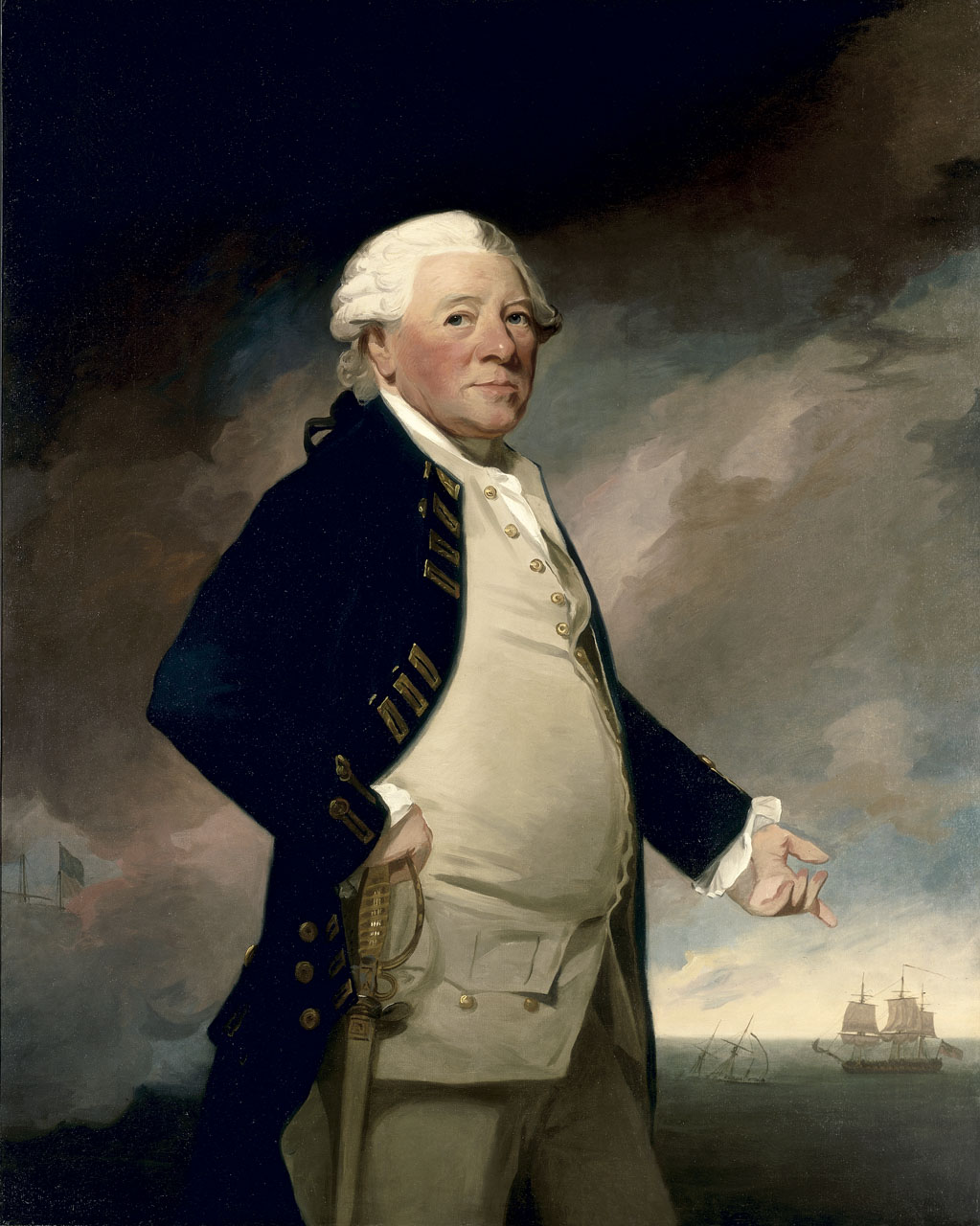
- Admiral Sir Hyde Parker, 5th Bt, George Romney
| Date | 30 October 1762 |
| Location | Off Cavite |
| Result | British victory |

Belligerents
| Great Britain | Spain |

Commanders and leaders
| Hyde Parker; Richard King | Unknown |

Strength
| 1 ship of the line 1 frigate | 1 galleon |

Casualties and losses
| 35 killed 37 wounded | 18 killed 10 wounded 750 captured 1 galleon captured |

The action of 30 October 1762 was a minor naval battle that was fought starting in the San Bernardino Strait and ending off the coast of Cavite, near the British-occupied Manila in the Philippines between two Royal Navy ships and a Spanish ship; the 60 gun ship of the line HMS Panther under Captain Hyde Parker and the frigate HMS Argo under Richard King captured the heavily armed Spanish treasure galleon Santisima Trinidad.

== Background ==
The Santisima Trinidad was a large ship constructed in 1750 at Manila with 60 guns and, at the time, the largest Manila galleon ever built. It was built for trade in the Pacific between the Spanish colonies. On 3 September 1762, the Trinidad departed the port of Cavite in the Spanish Philippines for Acapulco in Spanish Mexico with a cargo of valuables. However, she never left the San Bernardino Strait until late September due to contrary winds. On the night of 2–3 October, a storm, possibly the tail end of a typhoon, brought down the fore and mainmasts, and it was decided to turn back to Cavite under a jury rig. Unbeknownst to the ship's company, Spain and Great Britain were at war, as Spain had joined on the side of the French. As a result, a British and East India Company task force from India had thus captured Manila just as the Trinidad had left port.

== Battle ==
As Trinidad passed through the San Bernardino Strait, HMS Panther and HMS Argo soon discovered her and caught up with the Spanish ship. An action followed with Argo and Panther concentrating their fire on the masts and rigging. To Parker's amazement, the shots from Panther made a minimal impression on the galleon's hardwood hull. However, Trinidad was soon disabled and unable to manoeuvre as the opening gun battle left its rigging a dismasted wreck. Despite this, Trinidad managed to put up a stout resistance and continued for 2 hours, but the ship was overcrowded for its size of nearly 800 crew, marines, civilians, and large cargo. It had fewer than half the guns required to fight. Soon, the Spanish commander realised that any further resistance was futile and surrendered soon after. The human cost for the Spanish was 18 killed, 10 wounded, and 750 captured, while British casualties were 35 killed and 37 wounded.

== Aftermath ==
The cargo was valued at $1.5 million, and the ship at $3 million. The galleon was eventually broken up for scrap.

== See also ==
- Great Britain in the Seven Years War

== Bibliography ==
- Fish, Shirley (2011). The Manila-Acapulco Galleons: The Treasure Ships of the Pacific With an Annotated List of the Transpacific Galleons 1565–1815. Authorhouse. ISBN 978-1-4567-7542-1.
- Paine, Lincoln P. (2001). Warships of the world to 1900. Houghton Mifflin. ISBN 978-0-395-98414-7.
- Tracy, Nicholas (1995). Manila Ransomed. University of Exeter Press. ISBN 0859894266.
