= HMS Edgar (1758) =

Ship of the line of the Royal Navy

History

Great Britain
- Name: HMS Edgar
- Ordered: 19 April 1756
- Builder: Randall, Rotherhithe
- Launched: 16 November 1758
- Commissioned: December 1758
- Fate: Sunk as a breakwater, 1774

General characteristics
- Class & type: Edgar-class ship of the line
- Tons burthen: 1297 42/94 bm
- Length: 154 ft (47 m) (gundeck)
- Beam: 43 ft 6 in (13.26 m)
- Depth of hold: 18 ft 4 in (5.59 m)
- Propulsion: Sails
- Sail plan: Full-rigged ship
- Armament: 60 guns: Gundeck: 24 × 24 pdrs; Upper gundeck: 26 × 12 pdrs; Quarterdeck: 8 × 6 pdrs; Forecastle: 2 × 6 pdrs

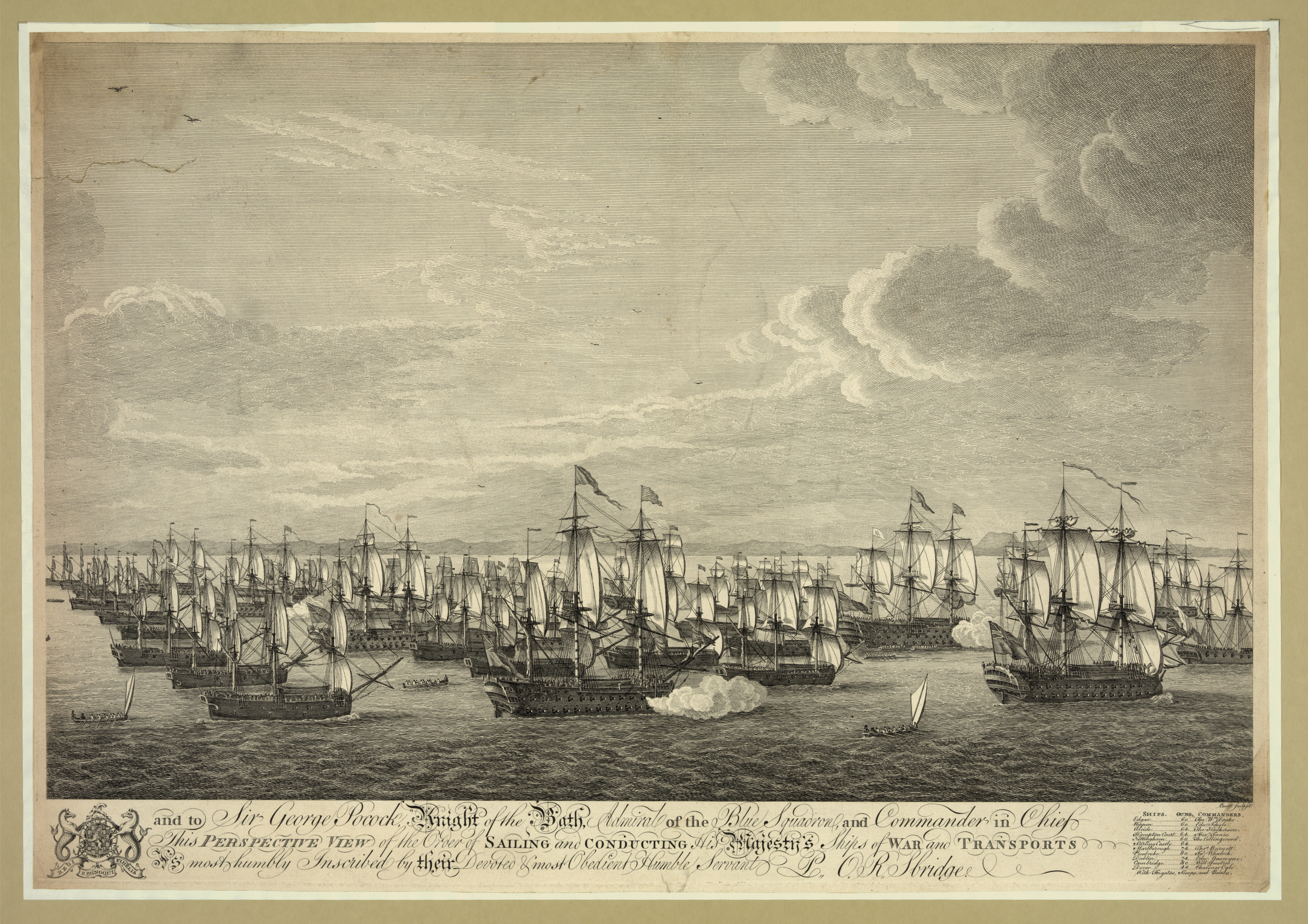
Shown here as a member Sir George Pocock's Blue Squadron, circa 1762

HMS Edgar was a 60-gun fourth rate ship of the line of the Royal Navy, launched on 16 November 1758 at Rotherhithe. The physician Thomas Denman served on Edgar until 1763. She was sunk as a breakwater in 1774.

== Service ==
Edgar was a 60-gun fourth rate Edgar class ship of the line. She was ordered on 13 April 1756 and laid down in the same month. Named on 13 September, she was launched on 16 November 1758. She was fitted out at Deptford Dockyard on 30 January 1759, making the final cost of her construction £27,627. She was commissioned by Captain Francis William Drake in December 1758, and sailed to join the Mediterranean Fleet on 14 April 1759. Edgar subsequently fought at the victorious Battle of Lagos on 19 August of the same year, and then in 1760 sailed to join the Western Squadron. She formed part of the force that captured Belle Île in June 1761, and on 26 February 1762 she again changed stations, sailing to Jamaica to join the Leeward Islands Station. As such Edgar served at the Siege of Havana between 6 June and 13 August of the same year, and at the end of the Anglo-Spanish War in 1763 she returned home to be paid off. At this point her surgeon, the physician Thomas Denman, also left the ship.

Edgar was recommissioned in December 1763 under the command of Captain George Collier to serve as the guardship at Plymouth, which role she undertook from February 1764. On 4 January 1765 she briefly sailed to the coat of Africa, but by the following year she had returned to her role at Plymouth. Captain Robert Carpenter took command from Collier in 1767, and he was in turn replaced by Captain the Honourable Henry St. John in 1771. Edgar was paid off by St. John in June, and she underwent a survey on 30 July. As a result of this it was ordered that Edgar was to be converted into a breakwater for Sheerness Dockyard on 23 March 1774. The conversion was completed at Chatham Dockyard and Edgar was sailed to Sheerness on 8 June, from where she was sunk in place in August. Her remains were broken up in 1775.
