= Mentor (1776 ship) =

History

Great Britain
- Builder: Philadelphia
- Launched: 1758
- Fate: Condemned 1791

General characteristics
- Tons burthen: 200, or 240, (bm)
- Armament: 6 × 3-pounder guns (1781-1783)

Mentor was launched in Philadelphia in 1758 under another name. For some time her name was British King. By the time she first appeared in Lloyd's Register (LR) in 1776 her name had become Mentor. From 1776 to 1790 she was a whaler in the Greenland whale fishery, though she also spent time trading generally, and as a transport. In 1791 she commenced a voyage to the southern whale fishery but received damage en route and was condemned at the River Plate.

== Career ==
Mentor first appeared in Lloyd's Register (LR) in 1776.

Year	Master	Owner	Trade	Source & notes
1776	Wm.Davis; Wm.Brown	Js.Mather	London–Davis Strait; London–Mogador	LR; repairs 1762, thorough repairs 1772 & 1773
1778	J.Christie	J.Mather	London–Greenland	LR; thorough repairs 1772 & 1773
1781	J.Christie	J.Mather	London–Greenland; London transport	LR; thorough repairs 1772, 1773, & 1778
1782	J.Christie; Jn.Jameson	J.Mather	London transport	LR; thorough repairs 1772, 1773, & 1778
1783	Jn.Jameson; J.Christie	Mather	Carolina–London; London–Greenland	LR; thorough repairs 1772, 1773, & 1778; repairs 1783
1784	J.Christie; J.Hallock	Mather	London–Greenland	LR; thorough repairs 1772, 1773, & 1778; repairs 1783
1787	J.Ellison; W.Anderson	Mather	London–Greenland	LR; thorough repairs 1772, 1773, & 1778; repairs 1783 & 1786
1789	Bartlett	Mather	London–Greenland	LR; thorough repairs 1772, 1773, & 1778; repairs 1783, 1786, & 1788
1790	Bartlett; Milne	Mather	London–Greenland	LR; thorough repairs 1772, 1773, & 1778; repairs 1783, 1786, & 1788; good repair 1790
1791	Milne; W.Ramsey	J.Mather	London–Petersburg; London-Southern Fishery	LR; thorough repairs 1772, 1773, & 1778; repairs 1783, 1786, & 1788; good repair 1790

Captain William Ramsey sailed on 22 July 1791, bound for the Southern Whale Fishery.

== Fate ==
Mentor was reported to have put into Buenos Aires or Montevideo on 20 December. She had sustained much damage and it was expected that she would be condemned.

LR continued to carry Mentor for some years thereafter, but with data unchanged since 1791. However, there is no subsequent mention in Lloyd's List ship arrival and departure data for 1791 to 1794 of a Mentor arriving back in Great Britain from the River Plate region.
