= Edgar-class ship of the line =

Class overview
- Name: Edgar
- Operators: Royal Navy
- Preceded by: 1745 Establishment
- In service: 22 June 1758 – 1813
- Completed: 3
- Lost: 1

General characteristics
- Type: Ship of the line
- Length: 154 ft (47 m) (gundeck); 126 ft (38 m) (keel)
- Beam: 43 ft 6 in (13.26 m)
- Propulsion: Sails
- Armament: 60 guns: Gundeck: 24 × 24-pounders; Upper gundeck: 26 × 12-pounders; Quarterdeck: 8 × 6-pounders; Forecastle: 2 × 6-pounders
- Notes: Ships in class include: Panther, Edgar, Firm

The Edgar-class ships of the line were a class of three 60-gun fourth rates, designed for the Royal Navy by Sir Thomas Slade.

== Ships ==
- HMS Panther

Builder: Martin and Henniker, Chatham
Ordered: 7 May 1756
Launched: 22 June 1758
Fate: Broken up, 1813

- HMS Edgar

Builder: Randall, Rotherhithe
Ordered: 19 April 1756
Launched: 16 November 1758
Fate: Sunk as a breakwater, 1774

- HMS Firm

Builder: Perry, Blackwall Yard
Ordered: 11 August 1756
Launched: 15 January 1759
Fate: Sold out of the service, 1791
