= HMS Panther (1758) =

Ship of the line of the Royal Navy

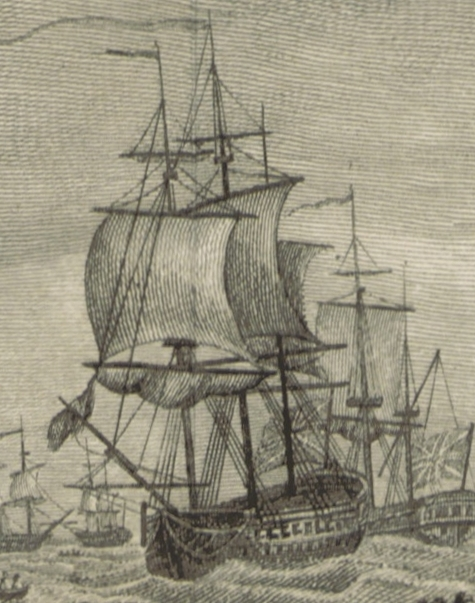
- Panther at the action of 4 February 1781

History

Great Britain
- Name: HMS Panther
- Ordered: 25 May 1756
- Builder: Martin and Henniker, Chatham
- Laid down: June 1756
- Launched: 22 June 1758
- Commissioned: 3 September 1758
- In service: 1758–1765; 1771–1774; 1777–1783; 1807–1813
- Fate: Broken up at Portsmouth Dockyard, November 1813

General characteristics
- Class & type: Edgar-class ship of the line
- Tons burthen: 1285 59/94 bm
- Length: 154 ft 0 in (46.94 m) (gundeck); 127 ft 0 in (38.71 m) (keel)
- Beam: 43 ft 7 in (13.28 m)
- Depth of hold: 18 ft 4 in (5.59 m)
- Sail plan: Full-rigged ship
- Complement: 420
- Armament: 60 guns: Gundeck: 24 × 24 pdrs; Upper gundeck: 26 × 12 pdrs; Quarterdeck: 8 × 6 pdrs; Forecastle: 2 × 6 pdrs

HMS Panther was a 60-gun fourth-rate ship of the line of the Royal Navy, launched on 22 June 1758 at Chatham Dockyard.

She served during the Seven Years' War, sailing for the far east to take part in the expedition against Manila. On 31 October 1761 Panther and the Coventry-class 24-gun sixth-rate Argo captured the Spanish galleon Spanish ship Santísima Trinidad in a two-hour action, loaded with cargo valued at $1.5 million.

Panther was fitted as a prison hulk at Plymouth Dockyard from 1807, and was broken up in 1813.
