= Mentor (1792 ship) =

British hired armed ship and merchant ship (1792–1832)

History

Great Britain
- Name: Mentor
- Launched: 1792, Wemyss
- Fate: Last listed in 1832

General characteristics
- Tons burthen: Originally: 19376/94, or 195, or 200, or 201 (bm); 1819: 273, or 275 (bm)
- Sail plan: Snow
- Armament: Armed ship: 10 × 4-pounder guns; 1806: 4 × 6-pounder guns

Mentor was launched in 1792 at Wemyss. With the out break of war with France in early 1793, the Royal Navy needed smaller vessels to protect convoys from privateers. The Navy employed Mentor as a hired armed vessel, releasing her from her contract at the end of 1801 after the signing of the Treaty of Amiens. She then returned to mercantile service, sailing first to Hamburg and then Oporto. She became a coaster on England's east coast, or a Baltic trader. She was last listed in 1832.

== Career ==
Mentor's contract with the Admiralty commenced on 24 March 1793.

Mentor was at Plymouth on 20 January 1795, and so shared in the proceeds of the detention of the Dutch naval vessels, East Indiamen, and other merchant vessels that were in port on the outbreak of war between Britain and the Netherlands.

On 2 March 1798, the frigate HMS Charon captured the French privateer lugger Alexandrine, of Brest, near Bury Head. The privateer was armed with four swivel guns and one carriage gun, and had a crew of 28 men under the command of Captain Auseline Septan. She was six days out of Morlaix but had not taken any prizes. Mentor and the hired armed luggers Attack and Alarm were in company and shared in the prize money. (Note: Alexandrine was a 4-ton cutter or lugger from Cherbourg, commissioned in 1796. She made one cruise in 1796 under Charles Casteleyn with 14 men and 2 swivel guns, and another in late 1797 or early 1798 under Jean Guillemette until HMS Charon captured her.)

Mentor's contract as an hired armed ship ended on 13 November 1801.

Mentor first appeared in Lloyd's Register (LR) and the Register of Shipping (RS) in 1802. Lloyd's Register described her as a snow, but the Register of Shipping described her as a brig.

| Year | Master | Owner | Trade | Source & notes |
|---|---|---|---|---|
| 1802 | H.Christie | LR: @ London; RS: Captain | London–Hamburg | LR & RS |
| 1804 | H.Christie | @ London | London–Oporto | LR |
| 1806 | H.Christie | "Drnkal & Co." | London–Oporto | LR |
| 1810 | H.Christie; E.Collins | "Drnkal & Co." | London–Oporto | LR |
| 1810 | H.Christie; Turnbull | Drinkall & Co. Green & Co. | London–Gibraltar; Shields–London | RS; new keel & thorough repair 1810 |
| 1812 | E.Collins; Noble | "Drnkal & Co." | London–Oporto | LR |
| 1812 | Turnbull | Green & Co. | Shields–London | RS; new keel & thorough repair 1810 |

Clearly, Lloyd's Register and the Register of Shipping diverged in 1812.

| Year | Master | Owner | Trade | Source & notes |
|---|---|---|---|---|
| 1813 | J.Noble | H.Megary & Co. | Plymouth–Swansea | LR; good repair 1812 |
| 1813 | Noble | Green & Co. | Shields–London | RS; new keel & thorough repair 1810 |
| 1818 | P.Noble; J.Green | H.Megary & Co. | Plymouth–Swansea | LR; good repair 1812 |
| 1818 | P.Noble; Green | Green & Co. J.Dewey | Shields–London | RS; new keel & thorough repair 1810, damages repaired 1818 |

On 27 October 1818, Mentor, of London, Green, master, returned to Newcastle after having run aground. She had run on the stones as she was leaving Newcastle with a cargo of coal and became very leaky. It was expected that she would have to unload.

| Year | Master | Owner | Trade | Source & notes |
|---|---|---|---|---|
| 1819 | J.Green | H.Megary & Co. | London–Newcastle | LR; good repair 1812 |
| 1819 | Green | J.Dewey | Shields–London | RS; new keel & thorough repair 1810, damages repaired 1818 |
| 1820 | J.Green | H.Megary & Co. | London–Newcastle | LR; good repair 1812 |
| 1820 | Green | J.Dewey | Shields–London | RS; lengthened & almost rebuilt 1819 |
| 1824 | W.Green; Atkinson | H.Megary & Co. | London–Newcastle | LR; lengthened and large repair 1820 |
| 1824 | Green | J.Dewey | Shields–London | RS; lengthened & almost rebuilt 1819 |
| 1825 | Atkinson | J.Leslie & Co. | Hull–Petersburg | LR; lengthened and almost rebuilt 1820, and good repair 1822 |
| 1825 | Atkinson | Leslie | Leith–Petersburg | RS; lengthened & thorough repair 1819 |
| 1826 | J.Atkinson | J.Leslie & Co. | Leith–Petersburg | LR; lengthened and almost rebuilt 1820 |
| 1826 | Atkinson | Leslie | Leith–Petersburg | RS; lengthened & thorough repair 1819 |

On 19 February 1826 Mentor, of Shields, struck the Cork Sand, in the North Sea off the coast of Essex and was abandoned. She subsequently came ashore near Woodbridge, Suffolk. Mentor was later refloated and taken in to Harwich, Essex.

| Year | Master | Owner | Trade | Source & notes |
|---|---|---|---|---|
| 1827 | J.Atkinson | J.Leslie & Co. | Leith–Petersburg | LR; lengthened and almost rebuilt 1820 |
| 1827 | Atkinson; Merton | Leslie; Young | Leith–Petersburg; Newcastle coaster | RS; lengthened & thorough repair 1819, and almost rebuilt 1826 |
| 1832 | J.Atkinson | J.Leslie & Co. | Leith–Petersburg | LR; lengthened and almost rebuilt 1820 |
| 1832 | Atkinson; Merton | Leslie; Young | Leith–Petersburg; Newcastle coaster | RS; almost rebuilt 1826 & good repair 1831 |

== Fate ==
Mentor was last listed in Lloyd's Register in the 1832 issue. She appeared in the 1833 issue of the Register of Shipping in 1833; that register ceased publication after the 1833 issue.
