= HMS Lenox (1758) =

Ship of the line of the Royal Navy

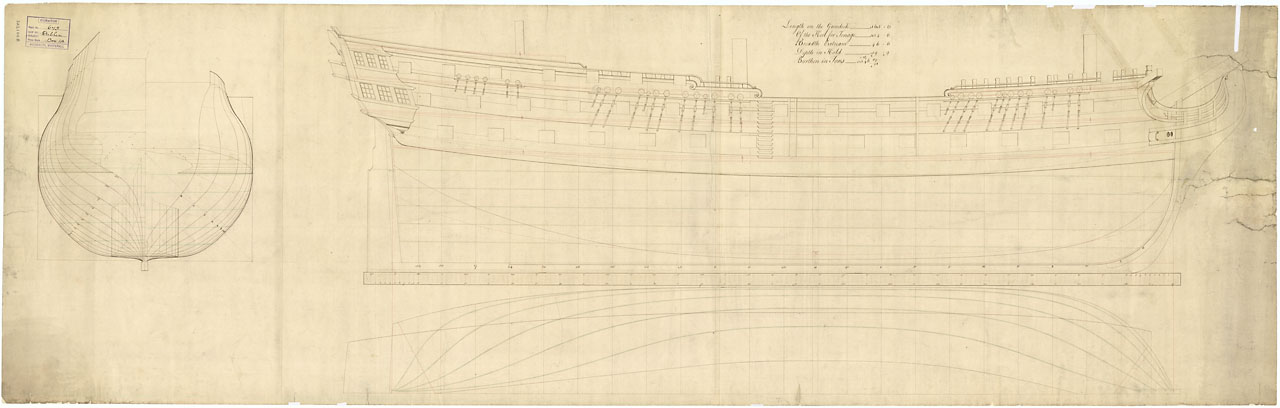
- Lenox

History

Great Britain
- Name: HMS Lenox
- Ordered: 17 November 1755
- Builder: Chatham Dockyard
- Laid down: 8 April 1756
- Launched: 25 February 1758
- Commissioned: 26 May 1758
- Fate: Sunk as breakwater, 1784; later raised and broken up May 1789

General characteristics
- Class & type: Dublin-class ship of the line
- Tons burthen: 157937/94 (bm)
- Length: 165 ft 6 in (50.44 m) (gundeck)
- Beam: 46 ft 6 in (14.17 m)
- Depth of hold: 19 ft 9 in (6.02 m)
- Propulsion: Sails
- Sail plan: Full-rigged ship
- Armament: 74 guns: Gundeck: 28 × 32 pdrs; Upper gundeck: 28 × 18 pdrs; Quarterdeck: 14 × 9 pdrs; Forecastle: 4 × 9 pdrs

HMS Lenox was a 74-gun third rate ship of the line of the Royal Navy, launched on 25 February 1758 at Chatham Dockyard.

She was sunk as a breakwater in 1784.
