= Spanish ship Santísima Trinidad (1751) =

Galleon captured by the British in 1762

History

Spain
- Name: Santísima Trinidad
- Builder: Bagatao Shipyards
- Launched: April 30, 1751
- Captured: September 30, 1762, by Royal Navy
- Fate: Sold 1763

General characteristics
- Class & type: 70-gun galleon
- Tons burthen: at most 2,200 bm
- Length: 167 ft 6 in (51.05 m) (gundeck)
- Beam: 50 ft 6 in (15.39 m)
- Draught: 30 ft 6 in (9.30 m)
- Propulsion: Sails
- Sail plan: Full-rigged ship
- Complement: 413
- Armament: 70 guns of various weights of shot

Santísima Trinidad was a galleon destined for merchant shipping between the Philippines and Mexico. Launched in 1751, she was one of the largest Manila galleons built. Officially named Santísima Trinidad y Nuestra Señora del Buen Fin, and familiarly known as The Mighty (Spanish: El Poderoso), she is not to be confused with the ship-of-the-line the Nuestra Señora de la Santísima Trinidad, the largest warship in the world when launched in 1759.

== Construction ==
Armed with 60 guns, her keel was laid in Bagatao Island shipyard (Real Astillero) Sorsogon in 1751 with a carrying capacity of 2,000 tons. With a length of 167 feet and a beam of 50 feet, she was "one of the largest galleons ever built in the Philippines," able to carry 5,068 crates of cargo. Orders came from the Governor-General of the Philippines Don Francisco José de Ovando, 1st Marquis of Brindisi. Her large volume and some construction errors made modifications necessary in 1757 to reduce her displacement.

== Voyage of 1755 ==
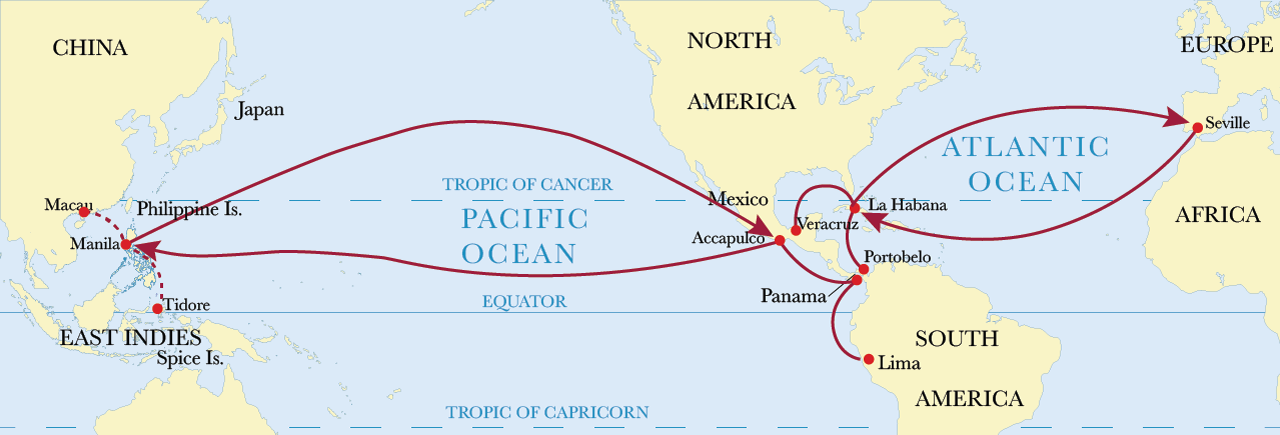
Manila-Accapulco galleon trade route, showing onward route to Spain

In 1755, the Santísima Trinidad, steered by French pilot Antoine Lemaire de Boucourt, made a bad voyage from Manila to Acapulco which lasted 221 days and is said to be the third longest in the history of the line; it started on 23d of July, 1755, with 435 persons on board, of whom 74 died on the way, by tabardillo, a kind of typhus, and/or by lack of water (rainfall). Among the victims were former Governor General of the Philippines Marquis Ovando and his young son, who was only eight days old. The voyage ended in Acapulco, after a long stop in San José del Cabo, on 27 February 1756.

== Capture ==
On 3 September 1762 she departed from Cavite towards Acapulco, but due to a severe storm near the Marianas, she lost a mast. The captain decided to return to the Philippines for repair, unaware that Manila had fallen into British hands after the Battle of Manila.

The ship was intercepted by two British warships, the 60-gun fourth-rate HMS Panther under Hyde Parker and the 28-gun sixth-rate HMS Argo under Richard King. Panther opened fire, but did little damage to her thick wooden hull and caused few casualties. Nevertheless, the disheartened crew of Santísima Trinidad decided to surrender. On board was cargo valued at $1.5 million, besides the value of the ship at $3 million. Previously, Filipina had been captured with her cargo of American silver from Acapulco.

The ship was taken to Portsmouth, where her sale earned the two captains 30,000 pounds, a fortune at that time. It is not known what happened to the ship after the sale but she was probably scrapped.

== See also ==
- Francisco José de Ovando, 1st Marquis of Brindisi
