= François Coulomb the Younger =

François Coulomb the Younger (La Ciotat, Province of Provence 1691 - Toulon, July 1751) was a French naval architect (ingénieur-constructeur), the son of François Coulomb the Elder. During his career, he designed 18 ships for the French Navy, and oversaw the construction of most of them.

== Biography ==
Born to a family of naval engineers of renown, the son of François Coulomb the Elder, François Coulomb was appointed master-constructor in 1727.

His first designs were for the 8-gun bomb vessels Tempête (launched 1726) and Foudroyante (1728). In 1727, he designed the frigate Zéphyr (1728), a light (demi-batterie) frigate of 28 guns. In 1730, he designed the 50-gun Diamant.

In 1733, he completed the design of the 62-gun Borée. In 1737, he began the 74-gun Terrible (1739). Both ships were longer than their predecessors, each allowing an extra pair of guns on their lower decks.

The year 1740 saw the design and commencement of the 80-gun Tonnant (launched 1743). In 1743, he designed the 28-gun frigate Diane (launched 1744).

In 1745, he designed the 64-gun Triton, and the 74-gun Conquérant (1746), which was rebuilt in 1764 to the specifications of the Citoyen class.

In 1748, he began work on the 80-gun Foudroyant and the 30-gun Pomone, and the next year, the 50-gun Hippopotame. He designed two more 74-gun ships - Redoutable and Téméraire - which were completed after his death.

His last achievement, in 1751, was the design of the 80-gun ship of the line Océan. The plans were completed just before he died, and the ship was built by Joseph Chapelle and launched in 1756.

== Bibliography ==
- Roche, Jean-Michel (2005). Dictionnaire des bâtiments de la flotte de guerre française de Colbert à nos jours 1 1671 - 1870. Roche. p. 223. ISBN 978-2-9525917-0-6. OCLC 165892922.
- Nomenclature des navires français de 1715 a 1774. Alain Demerliac (Editions Omega, Nice – 1995).
- Winfield, Rif and Roberts, Stephen (2017) French Warships in the Age of Sail 1626-1786: Design, Construction, Careers and Fates. Seaforth Publishing. ISBN 978-1-4738-9351-1.
- Le Téméraire, Vaisseau de ligne de 74 canons
- Solange Ami, Les maîtres constructeurs de la marine à Toulon au XVIIIe siècle, Mémoire en vue de la maîtrise d'histoire, Faculté des lettres et sciences humaines de Nice, 1974.
- Éric Rieth, Le « Livre de construction des vaisseaux » (1683) du maître charpentier toulonnais François Coulomb (1654-1717).
- Archives Nationales, série C/7/74, dossiers Coulomb.
- Archives départementales du Var, Parish Register St.Louis, Toulon 7 E 145/40
