= HMS Modeste (1759) =

Ship of the line of the Royal Navy

- Modeste

History

France
- Name: Modeste
- Builder: Toulon
- Laid down: April 1756
- Launched: 12 February 1759
- Completed: May 1759
- Captured: 18 August 1759, by Royal Navy

Great Britain
- Name: HMS Modeste
- Acquired: 18 August 1759 (captured); 7 January 1760 (purchased)
- Reclassified: Receiving ship from 1778
- Fate: Broken up in August 1800

General characteristics
- Class & type: 64-gun third rate ship of the line
- Tons burthen: 1,357 47/94 bm
- Length: 158 ft 6 in (48.3 m) (overall); 129 ft (39.3 m) (keel)
- Beam: 44 ft 5.75 in (13.6 m)
- Depth of hold: 19 ft 8 in (5.99 m)
- Propulsion: Sails
- Sail plan: Full-rigged ship
- Complement: 500
- Armament: 64 guns: Lower deck: 26 × 24-pdrs; Upper deck: 28 × 12-pdrs; Quarterdeck: 6 × 6-pdrs; Forecastle: 4 × 6-pdrs

HMS Modeste was a 64-gun third rate ship of the line of the Royal Navy. She was previously the 64-gun Modeste, of the French Navy, launched in 1759 and captured later that year.

== French career and capture ==
Modeste was laid down at Toulon in April 1756 to a design by Noël Pomet, and was launched on 12 February 1759. Work on her was completed by May 1759, and she joined Chef d'escadre Jean-François de La Clue-Sabran's fleet in the port. The Seven Years' War was being fought at the time, and the Toulon fleet was being blockaded by Admiral Edward Boscawen. Taking advantage of the British fleet's departure for supplies, the French left port and sailed into the Atlantic. There they were chased and finally brought to battle by Boscawen off Lagos, Portugal. The ensuing Battle of Lagos, fought between 18 and 19 August 1759, saw the defeat of the French fleet, with two of their ships destroyed and three taken. Captured alongside Modeste were the 74-gun ships Téméraire and Centaure.

Taken as a prize into Portsmouth, she was surveyed there that December, and was purchased for the navy on 7 January 1760 for the sum of £17,068.18.1 1/2. She was named HMS Modeste, retaining her French name, on 11 January and was added to the navy lists. Having been commissioned into the navy, she underwent a refit in June and July 1760.

== British career ==
Modeste was commissioned under her first commander, Captain Henry Speke, in April 1760, though command soon passed to Captain Robert Boyle-Walsingham. Boyle-Walsingham went out to the Mediterranean and was involved in naval operations there, capturing the 32-gun Bouffonne off Cádiz at the action of 17 July 1761, while in company with HMS Thetis. Modeste then sailed to the Leeward Islands in October 1761 and was present at the reduction of Martinique in January and February 1762. Captain John Hollwall took command later that year and Modeste remained in the Leeward Islands until returning to Britain to be paid off in March 1764.

She spent the next few years laid up, being occasionally surveyed and repaired as required. She was fitted out at Portsmouth in early 1771 and was recommissioned as a guard ship under Captain John Wheelock. She went out to Jamaica in June 1771, but returned to Britain to be paid off in October 1772. She was fitted out for her final role, a receiving ship at Portsmouth, between July and August 1778. She saw out the rest of the American War of Independence and most of the French Revolutionary Wars in this state, until finally being broken up at Portsmouth in August 1800.
