= Battle of Lagos =

1759 battle of the Seven Years' War

- Part of the Seven Years' War
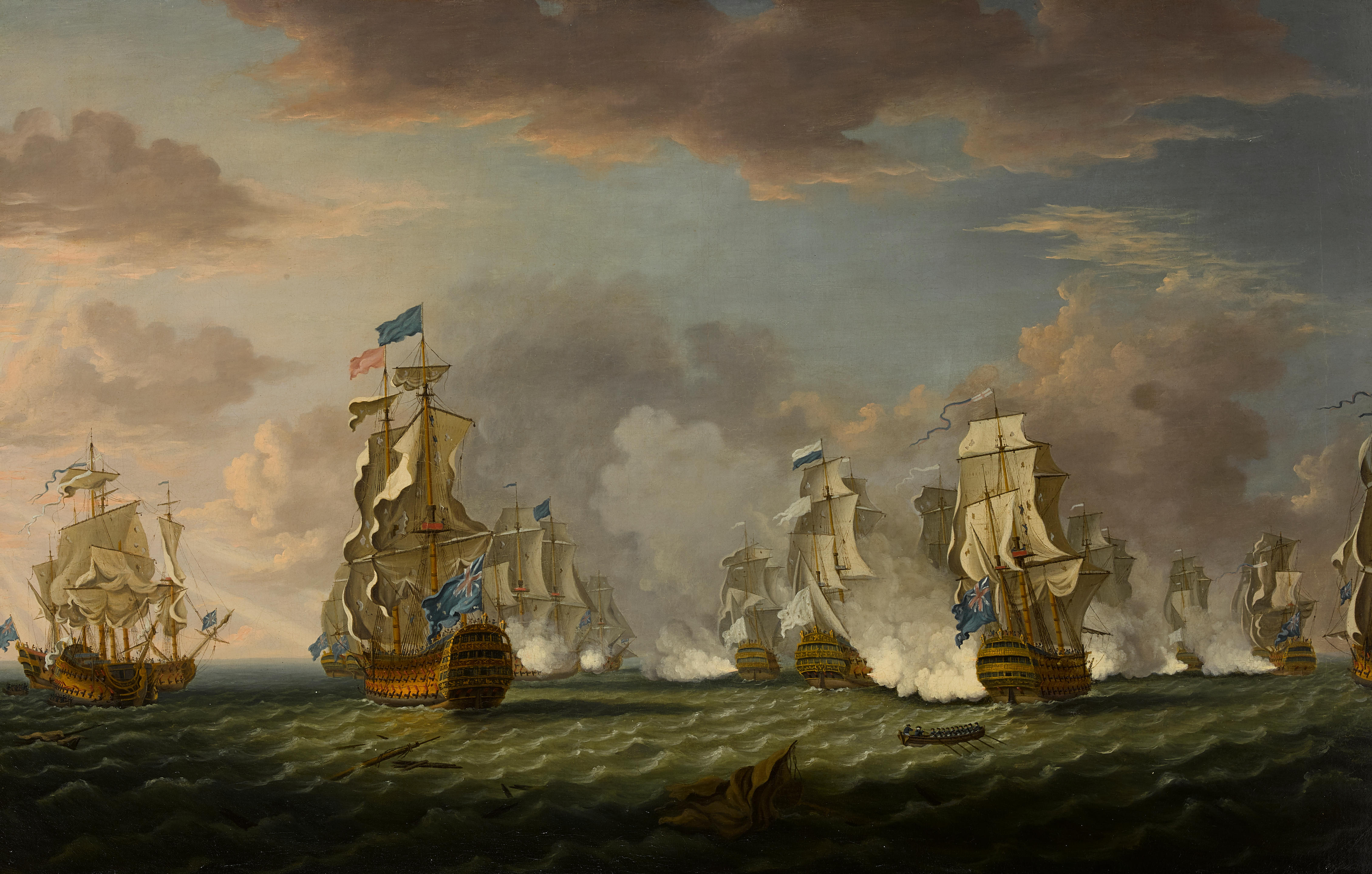
- The battle off Lagos, August 18, 1759; Richard Paton, 1760
Date	18–19 August 1759
Location	Off Lagos, Atlantic Ocean 36.3°N 7.3°W
Result	British victory

Belligerents
Great Britain	France

Commanders and leaders
Edward Boscawen	Jean-François de La Clue-Sabran

Strength
15 ships of the line; 10 frigates; 2 sloops; 2 fireships	12 ships of the line; 3 frigates

Casualties and losses
56 killed; 196 wounded	500 killed, wounded or captured; 3 ships of the line captured; 2 ships of the line destroyed

The Battle of Lagos took place between a British fleet commanded by Edward Boscawen and a French fleet under Jean-François de La Clue-Sabran over two days in 1759 during the Seven Years' War. They fought south west of the Gulf of Cádiz on 18 August and to the east of the small Portuguese port of Lagos, after which the battle is named, on 19 August.

La Clue was attempting to evade Boscawen and bring the French Mediterranean Fleet into the Atlantic, avoiding battle if possible; he was then under orders to sail for the West Indies. Boscawen was under orders to prevent a French breakout into the Atlantic, and to pursue and fight the French if they did. During the evening of 17 August the French fleet successfully passed through the Strait of Gibraltar, but was sighted by a British ship shortly after it entered the Atlantic. The British fleet was in nearby Gibraltar, undergoing a major refit. It left port amidst great confusion, most ships not having their refurbishments completed, with many delayed and sailing in a second squadron. Aware that he was pursued, La Clue altered his plan and changed course; half his ships failed to follow him in the dark, but the British did.

The British caught up with the French on 18 August and fierce fighting ensued, during which several ships were badly damaged and one French ship was captured. The British pursued the remaining ships through the moonlit night of 18–19 August, during which two French ships made their escape. On 19 August the remnants of the French fleet attempted to shelter in neutral Portuguese waters near Lagos. Boscawen then captured a further two French ships and destroyed the other two.

== Background ==
The endemic ill feeling between France and Great Britain during the 18th century turned into open warfare in 1754 and 1755. In 1756 what became known as the Seven Years' War broke out across Europe, pitting France, Austria and Russia against Britain and Prussia. France supported Austria and Russia in a land campaign against Prussia, and launched what it saw as its main effort in a maritime and colonial offensive against Britain.

By the beginning of 1759 neither alliance had the advantage, in either the land or sea campaigns, and both were having serious problems financing the war. In 1759 more than 60 per cent of French revenue went to service its debt, causing numerous shortages. The French Navy in particular was overstretched and suffered from the lack of a coherent doctrine, exacerbated by the inexperience verging on incompetence of the secretary of state for the navy, Nicolas René Berryer, a former chief of police. Meanwhile, Britain's war effort up to early 1757 had been a failure, with setbacks in Europe, North America, India and at sea. From June it came under the control of the assertive new secretary of state for the Southern Department (foreign minister), William Pitt, who imposed a coordinated strategy. It consisted of a naval and colonial effort to expel the French from North America and ruin their maritime trade, while dispersing their efforts between fighting Prussia in Europe and attempting to defend the wide range of French overseas possessions. By early 1759 this was beginning to bear fruit.

In response to the British successes, the ministers of the French king, Louis XV, planned a direct invasion of Britain, which, if successful, would have decided the war in their favour. An army of 17,000 was collected at Vannes, in the south east of Brittany, and nearly 100 transports were assembled near Quiberon Bay. In its final form the French plan required these transports to be escorted by the French navy. However, at the best of times the French struggled to crew their full fleet with experienced mariners; landsmen could be used, but even a small deficiency in ship handling translated into a marked handicap in combat. Three years into the war, thousands of French seamen were held as prisoners by the British; many more were engaged in speculative, and occasionally lucrative, privateering careers; and the unhealthy conditions, onerous onboard discipline and poor wages, paid late, were a strong disincentive to service. The transports also required at least a cadre of skilled men.

The French possessed 73 ships of the line, the largest warships of the time: 30 serving abroad and 43 in home waters. The latter were split between the Atlantic port of Brest (22 ships) and the Mediterranean port of Toulon, with a small number at two ports on the Bay of Biscay: Lorient and Rochefort. In total these ships required an aggregate complement of about 25,000 men; they were more than 9,000 short of this. The British had 40 ships of the line in home waters, and a further 15 in their Mediterranean Fleet, which was based in Gibraltar.

=== Prelude ===
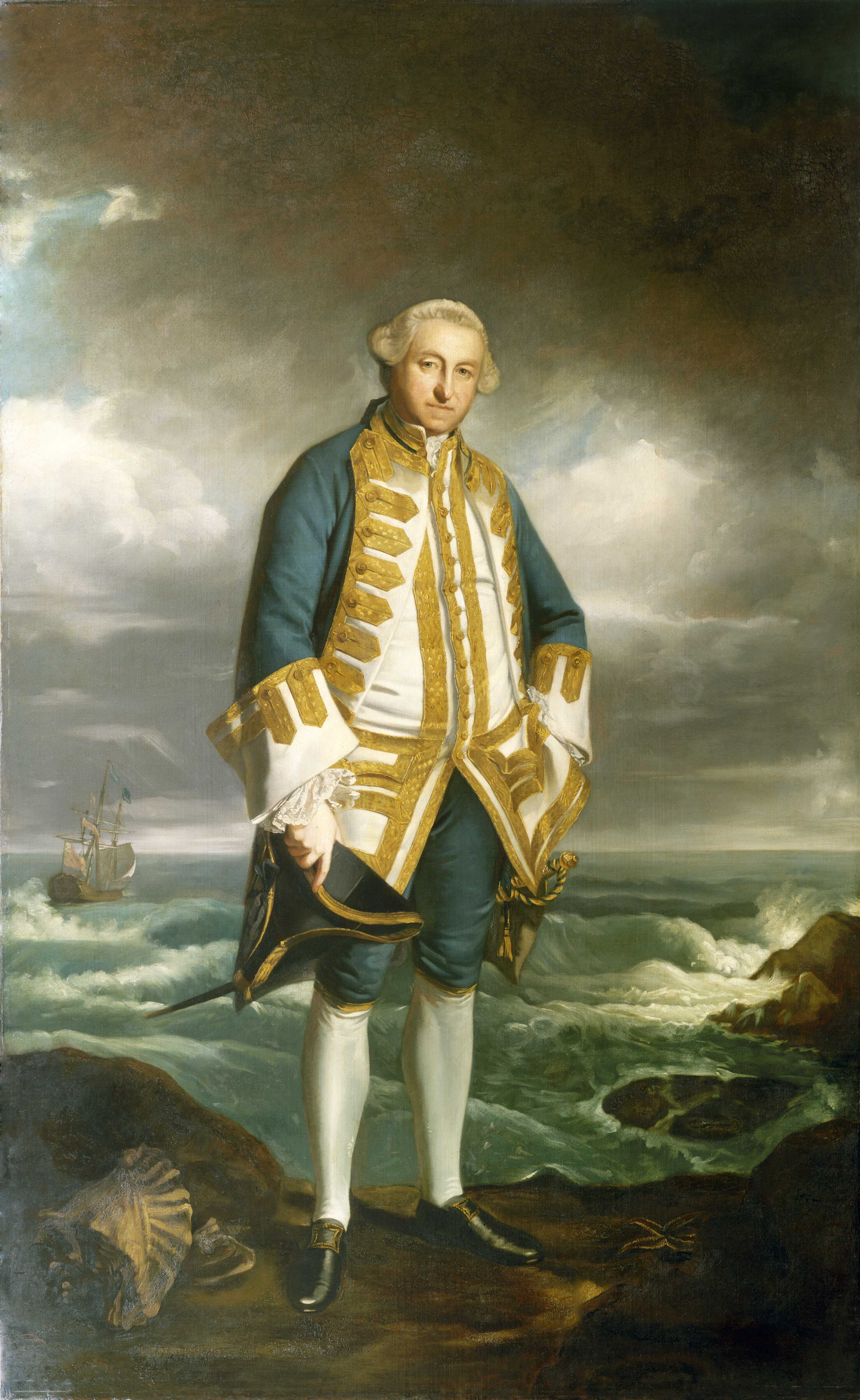
Edward Boscawen

In May 1759 Edward Boscawen took command of the British fleet in the Mediterranean. As well as 15 ships of the line he also had 12 frigates – smaller and faster than ships of the line and primarily intended for raiding, reconnaissance and messaging. He was tasked with harassing the French, protecting British merchant shipping, and ensuring the safety of the British outpost and naval base at Gibraltar. By late July the ships of the British fleet were low on supplies and in urgent need of maintenance after their prolonged period at sea, during which some ships had been damaged by enemy action. The fleet retired to Gibraltar, arriving on 4 August. There they began the difficult process of scraping the bottoms of the ships free of barnacles and seaweed, repairing and replacing their rigging and replacing spars. While this refurbishment was under way, fresh orders arrived, alerting Boscawen to the likelihood that the French Mediterranean Fleet would attempt to join up with their Atlantic Fleet, probably at Brest, and instructing him to prevent it. He ordered the first two of his frigates to be ready for sea to patrol to the east, where the Mediterranean narrowed to the bottleneck of the Strait of Gibraltar, to give warning if the French were to attempt to break out.

Earlier in the year, an aspect of the British strategy had played out in the West Indies. In February, 4,000 British soldiers landed on the French West Indian possession of Guadeloupe. This island's immense sugar production was supposed to exceed that of all the British Leeward Islands combined. After great difficulties in preparing them for sea, nine French ships of the line, under Maximin de Bompart, were despatched to relieve the island. They arrived the day after the French governor surrendered to the British on 1 May.

News of this disaster was passed back to Paris, where after deliberation it was decided to reinforce Bompart's force with the Mediterranean Fleet. Orders to sail reached its commander, Admiral Jean-François de La Clue-Sabran, at the end of July, and it left Toulon on 5 August. It consisted of twelve ships of the line and three frigates. La Clue intended to pass the Strait of Gibraltar by night, in order to keep the British in ignorance of his absence from the Mediterranean. He anticipated this might scatter his fleet, and he had ordered his ships to rendezvous off the Spanish port of Cádiz. During the late evening of 17 August the French passed through the strait, but were observed shortly afterwards by the British frigate HMS Gibraltar. The French were aware they had been spotted, and realising by now that the British fleet was in Gibraltar, anticipated a prompt pursuit.

The approach of the Gibraltar, firing her guns to indicate that the enemy had been sighted, took the British by surprise. There was a scramble to get under way. Most captains and many crew were ashore; some, including Boscawen, were dining several miles away. Most ships sailed without their captains, some under the command of junior officers. Their seniors followed on as best they could – the flagship, HMS Namur, sailed with three captains and the admiral on board – and sorted themselves out as circumstances allowed. Many officers and men were left ashore. Several ships were barely seaworthy. The process of fitting, or "bending", sails to the masts of the large warships of the time was a complicated one, and most British ships were forced to do this as they got under way, in the dark, undermanned and with few officers. Some were also fitting spars or even stepping in their topmasts. Ships were cluttered with material for their refits and with unstowed stores. HMS Prince had so many casks on one of her gun decks as to be unable to operate that deck's guns; the crew of HMS America threw large amounts of loose material overboard. Despite these difficulties, by 11:00 pm, within three hours of Gibraltar appearing, eight British ships of the line had warped out of the harbour and were heading for the Atlantic. Several ships were left behind, under Vice-Admiral Thomas Brodrick, with orders to sail as soon as they could be made fit for sea.

Ships sailing at night usually displayed lanterns from their sterns and masts, so as to avoid collisions and to allow groups of ships to maintain contact. Wishing to be as inconspicuous as possible, the French ships probably did not follow this practice. The French ships had all been issued with sealed orders, which they were to open on passing the Strait of Gibraltar; these instructed them that the fleet was to rendezvous at Cádiz. Knowing they had been observed by the British, La Clue changed his plan. Instead of heading for Cádiz, where he feared he could be easily blockaded by the British, he decided to sail more westerly, to clear Cape St. Vincent and head into the North Atlantic. However, the French navy did not have an effective system of night signalling. So at about midnight La Clue had his flagship, Océan, light her stern lantern, turn to port (left, or westward) and reduce her speed. Normally, such actions would be accompanied by firing a cannon to draw attention. The naval historian Sam Willis suggests it is possible that La Clue – who had been ordered to avoid battle at all costs – knowing the entire fleet was relatively close and not wishing to advertise his manoeuvre to the British, omitted to do this.

== Battle ==
=== At sea ===
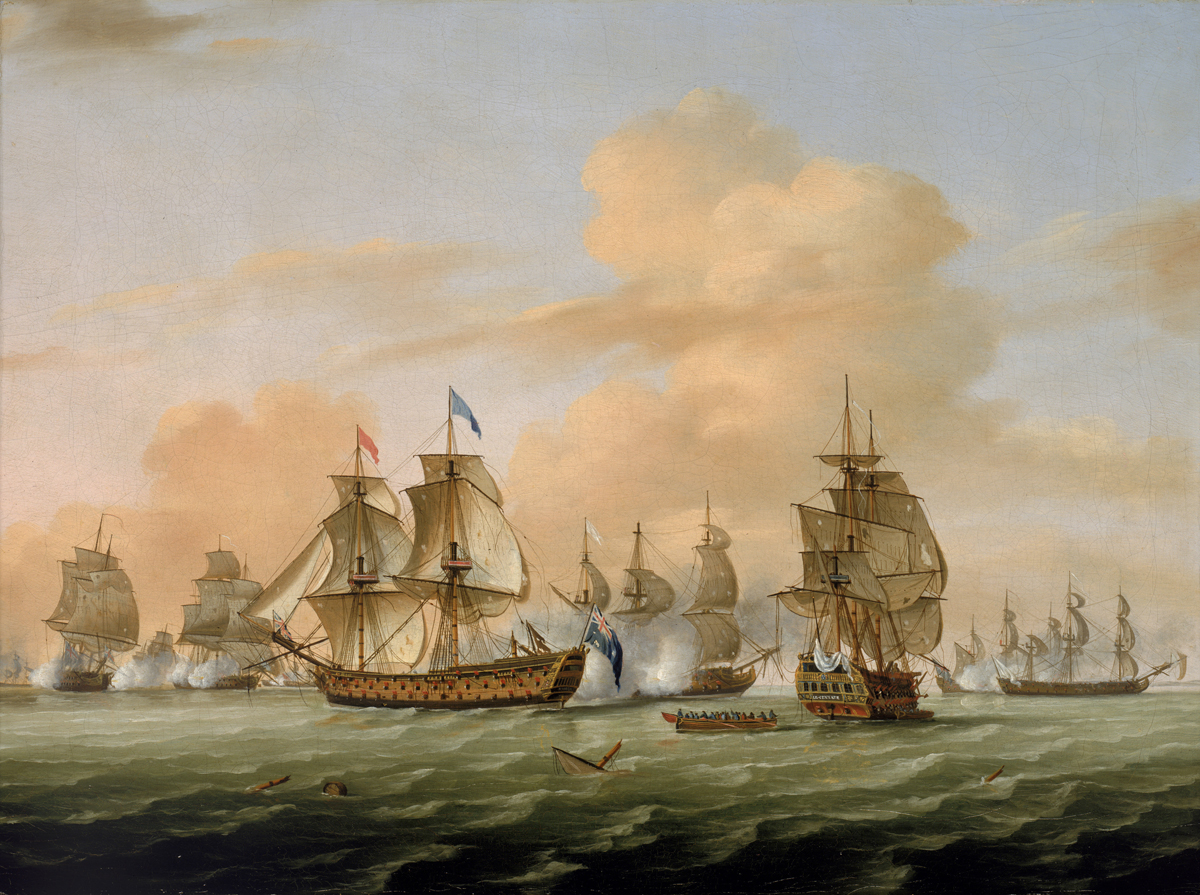
The Battle of Lagos by Thomas Luny

Eight of the fifteen ships in the French fleet continued on to Cádiz. It is not clear if this was because they did not observe the flagship's change of course, because they did not understand its implications, or because they felt their freshly opened orders took precedence. At dawn on 18 August La Clue could see only six other ships. He ordered them to rally on the flagship and heave to and await the anticipated appearance of the rest of the fleet. At about 6:00 am a group of large ships came into view and La Clue remained stationary, believing them to be the missing component of his fleet. It was only when the topsails of the nine ships of the second British squadron, the stragglers under Brodrick, were sighted farther back that it was realised all these ships were British.

The seven French ships sailed at the speed of their slowest member. Boscawen ordered his ships to maintain formation, to avoid his fastest ships reaching and engaging the French squadron individually and being defeated in detail. The British ships proved to be faster, and were slightly favoured by variable winds, allowing them to gradually overhaul the French by the afternoon of 18 August. Boscawen repeatedly signalled to his ships to "Make more speed". Several of the British ships were hampered by their newly warped sails splitting, or their newly fitted spars breaking loose, as they were overstrained by crews eager to catch the French. At 1:00 pm the French ships hoisted their battle ensigns and opened fire at long range. Ships of the line had most of their guns mounted in their sides, to allow them to fire broadsides, but had a small number of lighter guns mounted in their sterns, able to fire to their rears. It was not possible to effectively fire ahead of such ships. The French were thus able to fire at the British as they grew closer, while the British were unable to offer much reply. The French attempted to disable the British ships' sails and rigging, but with little effect.

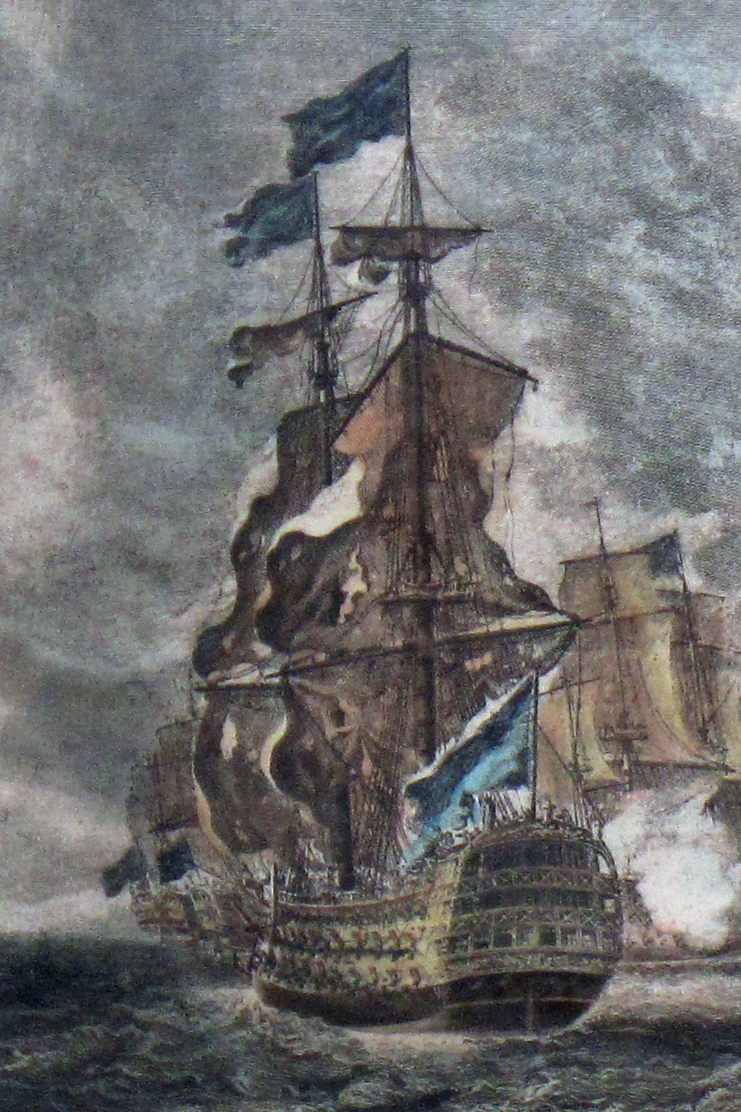
The British flagship, HMS Namur

At 2:30 pm the British Culloden engaged the rearmost French ship, the Centaure; they were evenly matched, each being equipped with 74 heavy guns, 37 on each side. By this time the French had formed a line ahead formation, with their flagship in the centre. Boscawen claimed he wished his leading, and therefore his fastest, ships to engage the first French ships they encountered; then, as the next British ship arrived, bypass this fight to attack the next French ship in line. Any bypassed French ships could, he believed, be safely left to Brodrick's squadron. However, only his own flagship adopted this approach, and only four of the seven French ships were engaged. Centaure was attacked by five British ships, fighting on for five hours and seriously delaying the British pursuit before surrendering after being battered into a wreck and having more than a third of her crew killed or wounded.

Meanwhile, Boscawen had pressed on in his 90-gun flagship, determined to engage the largest ship in the French fleet, La Clue's flagship, the 80-gun Océan. Namur passed three French ships, receiving a broadside from each; Boscawen ordered that there be no return fire, instead having his crew lie down, to minimise casualties. By 4:00 pm Namur was close enough to Océan to open fire and a short, sharp fight developed. Océan had nearly 200 men killed or wounded, with La Clue among the latter; while Namur had one of her three masts shot away, together with the topsail yards of both remaining masts. With Namur unable to manoeuvre, Océan, also badly damaged, fled. Boscawen transferred his flag to Newark.

As the sun set, the six surviving French ships continued to flee to the north west, with those British ships not slowed by battle damage close behind them. There was sufficient moonlight to allow the British ships to keep in touch, although two French ships, Souverain and Guerrier, slipped away into the Atlantic during the night. The naval historian Nicholas Tracey suggests La Clue sailed an incorrect course, failed to weather Cape St. Vincent, and became trapped against a lee shore. The badly wounded La Clue now had command only over his flagship and three other ships of the line, Redoutable, Téméraire and Modeste, none of which had yet been engaged. Despairing of escape, he led the remnants of his fleet to a small river west of Lagos in Portugal. Portugal was neutral and it would be illegal for Boscawen to attack him there. There was also a small Portuguese fort overlooking the anchorage and La Clue may have hoped this would be some deterrent.

=== Off Lagos ===
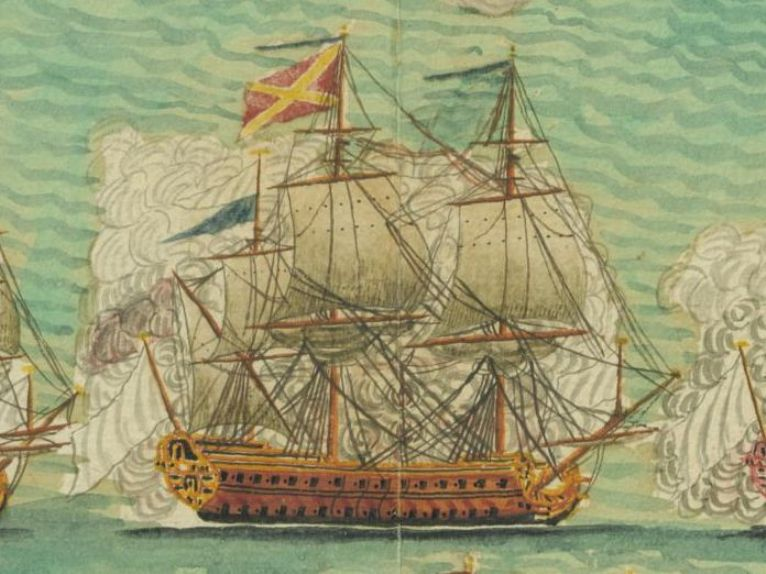
The French ship of the line Redoutable

As Boscawen approached in Newark, the Portuguese opened fire and he hove to outside of cannon range and selected several ships to attack the French "without any regard to the laws of neutrality." The British America attacked Océan, firing a broadside from short range and demanding her surrender. The French, who had been in the process of abandoning ship, struck their colours. (Note: A ship's "colours", a national flag or battle ensign, are hauled down from her mast, or "struck", to indicate that the ship has surrendered.) The British were unable to tow Océan off as she had been run ashore with some force in order to prevent this. So they evacuated those left of the crew and set fire to her; several hours later, around midnight, the fire reached her magazine and she exploded.

Three ships from Brodrick's rear squadron were sent in after the Redoutable. HMS Prince fired repeatedly into her and then boarded her. She was also firmly beached and so, like Océan, she was torched, and also exploded several hours later. Having observed Océan and Redoutable set alight and seeing HMS Jersey sailing towards them, the crew of Modeste fled or surrendered and she was towed out, little damaged, to the British fleet; Jersey was fired on by the Portuguese forts during this operation. The last French ship, Téméraire, was attacked by Warspite at 2:45 pm, but her crew refused to surrender. Warspite manoeuvred so as to be able to fire into Téméraire's stern, where the French could do little to fire back, and after an hour Téméraire also struck her colours and was towed out.

== Aftermath ==
The French had 500 men killed, wounded or captured; against 56 British fatalities and 196 wounded. La Clue, seriously wounded, was carried ashore before the British arrived and survived; five years later he was promoted to lieutenant-general. The battle had no effect on the French plans to invade Britain. The two French ships which escaped from the battle eventually reached Rochefort. The five French ships in Cádiz were blockaded by Boscawen's second-in-command, Admiral Brodrick. They were instructed to head for French Atlantic ports if they were able to break this blockade, with a view to reinforcing the fleet in Brest. But by the time they evaded Brodrick during a winter storm in January 1760, the French Atlantic Fleet had been destroyed at the Battle of Quiberon Bay, and they returned to Toulon instead.

Hearing the news of the victory, the notoriously nervous British prime minister, the Duke of Newcastle, said "I was afraid of invasion till now." Boscawen's violation of Portuguese neutrality was fully supported by his government, which placated the Portuguese by persuading them that it was an inadvertent result of Boscawen's general chase order. Three years later, the Spanish and French governments used this breach of neutrality as one of their pretexts for declaring war on and invading Portugal. Boscawen, his captains and their crews were fêted in Britain. After completing their interrupted refits, several of Boscawen's victorious ships were transferred to Admiral Edward Hawke's fleet off Brest, and five were with Hawke when he destroyed the Brest fleet in Quiberon Bay in November.

The historian Sarah Kinkel describes the Battle of Lagos as a "definitive" victory. The historian Geoffrey Blainey describes Boscawen as perhaps the most successful naval commander of the 18th century, "when inconclusive battles at sea were normal." The battle was one of a series of British victories in 1759 which caused the year to be known as an annus mirabilis (Latin for "year of wonders").

The three captured French ships went on to serve in the British navy as HMS Centaur, Modeste and Temeraire. (Note: The HMS Temeraire which featured in the painting The Fighting Temeraire by J. M. W. Turner was a different, later ship with the same name.) Serving on board Océan as a junior officer was Pierre André de Suffren, who was later to gain fame as an admiral leading a French fleet in the Indian Ocean. A young slave named Olaudah Equiano, who would later become a prominent abolitionist in England, participated in the engagement on the British side. He included an account of the battle in his autobiography, The Interesting Narrative of the Life of Olaudah Equiano.

== Order of battle ==
=== Britain ===
Ships of the line: (Note: The number after each ship indicates number of guns it was rated to carry.)

- Namur 90 (flag)
- Prince 90
- Newark 80
- Warspite 74
- Culloden 74
- Conqueror 70
- Swiftsure 70
- Edgar 64
- St Albans 64
- Intrepid 60
- America 60
- Princess Louisa 60
- Jersey 60
- Guernsey 50
- Portland 50

Frigates:

- Ambuscade 40
- Rainbow 40
- Shannon 36
- Active 36
- Thetis 32
- Lyme 24
- Gibraltar 24
- Glasgow 24
- Sheerness 24
- Tartar's Prize 24

Sloops:

- Favourite 16
- Gramont 16

Fireships:

- Aetna 8
- Salamander 8

=== France ===
Ships which participated in the battle:

Ships of the line:

- Centaure 74 – captured 18 August
- Océan 80 (flag) – run aground and burnt 19 August
- Redoutable 74 – run aground and burnt 19 August
- Téméraire 74 – captured 19 August
- Modeste 64 – captured 19 August
- Souverain 74 – escaped
- Guerrier 74 – escaped

Ships which became separated at night and sailed to Cádiz:

Ships of the line:

- Triton 64
- Lion 64
- Fantasque 64
- Fier 50
- Oriflamme 50

Frigates:

- Minerve 26
- Chimère 26
- Gracieuse 26

== Notes, citations and sources ==
=== Sources ===
- Anderson, Fred (2001). Crucible of War: The Seven Years' War and the Fate of Empire in British North America, 1754–1766. London: Faber and Faber. ISBN 978-0571205653.
- Blainey, Geoffrey (1988). The Causes of War. Basingstoke, Hampshire: MacMillan. ISBN 0-333-46215-7.
- Chaline, Oliver (2011). "Quiberon Bay, 20 novembre 1759". Les cahiers du Pays de Guérande (in French) (53). Société des Amis de Guérande: 17–29. ISSN 0765-3565.
- Clowes, William Laird (1898). The Royal Navy, A History from the Earliest Times to Present. London: Sampson Low, Marston. OCLC 1084577790.
- Dull, Jonathan R. (2009). The Age of the Ship of the Line: The British and French Navies, 1650–1815. Barnsley, South Yorkshire: Pen & Sword Books. ISBN 978-1848325494.
- Francis, Alan David (1985). Portugal 1715–1808: Joanine, Pombaline and Rococo Portugal as Seen by British Diplomats and Traders. Colección Támesis (A ed.). London: Tamesis. p. 137. ISBN 978-0729301909.
- Jenkins, E.H. (1973). A History of the French Navy : From Its Beginnings to the Present Day. London: Macdonald and Jane's. ISBN 978-0356041964.
- Kemp, Peter, ed. (1976). The Oxford Companion to Ships and the Sea. London: Oxford University Press. ISBN 0192820842.
- Kinkel, Sarah (2013). "Disorder, Discipline, and Naval Reform in Mid-Eighteenth-Century Britain". The English Historical Review. 128 (535): 1451–1482. doi:10.1093/ehr/cet273. JSTOR 24473894.
- Longmate, Norman (1993). Island Fortress: The Defence of Great Britain, 1603–1945. London: Grafton. ISBN 978-0586208465.
- McLynn, Frank (2008). 1759: the Year Britain Became Master of the World. London: Vintage. ISBN 978-0099526391.
- Mahan, Alfred Thayer (1890). The Influence of Sea Power upon History, 1660–1783. London: Sampson, Low, Marston. OCLC 782063369.
- Middleton, Richard (1988). "Naval Administration in the Age of Pitt and Anson, 1755–1763". In Black, Jeremy & Woodfine, Philip (eds.). The British Navy and the Use of Naval Power in the Eighteenth Century. Leicester: Leicester University Press. pp. 109–127. OCLC 572510434.
- le Moing, Guy (2003). La Bataille navale des Cardinaux: 20 novembre 1759 (in French). Paris: Economica. ISBN 978-2717845037.
- Monaque, Rémi (2017). "Le Bailli Pierre-André De Suffren: A Precursor of Nelson". In Harding, Richard; Guimerá, Agustín (eds.). Naval Leadership in the Atlantic World: The Age of Reform and Revolution, 1700–1850. London: University of Westminster Press. pp. 85–92. ISBN 978-1911534082.
- Monod, Paul Kléber (2009). Imperial Island: A History of Britain and Its Empire, 1660–1837. Malden, Massachusetts: Wiley-Blackwell. ISBN 978-1405134446.
- Rodger, N.A.M. (2004). The Command of the Ocean: A Naval History of Britain 1649–1815. London: Penguin. ISBN 0-713-99411-8.
- Szabo, Franz A. J. (2007). The Seven Years' War in Europe 1756–1763. Harlow, Essex: Longman. ISBN 978-0582292727.
- Tracey, Nicholas (2010). The Battle of Quiberon Bay, 1759: Hawke and the Defeat of the French Invasion. Barnsley, South Yorkshire: Pen & Sword. ISBN 978-1848841161.
- Troude, Onesime-Joachim (1867). Batailles navales de la France, Volume 1 (in French). Paris: Libraire Commissionaire de la Marine. OCLC 757299734.
- Wilhelm, Thomas (1881). A Military Dictionary and Gazetteer. Philadelphia: L. R. Hamersly & Co. OCLC 1872456.
- Willis, Sam (2009). "The Battle of Lagos, 1759". The Journal of Military History. 73 (3): 745–765. doi:10.1353/jmh.0.0366. ISSN 0899-3718. S2CID 162390731.
- Winfield, Rif (2007). British Warships in the Age of Sail 1714–1792: Design, Construction, Careers and Fates. Barnsley, South Yorkshire: Seaforth Publishing. ISBN 978-1844157006.
