= Edward Boscawen =

Royal Navy officer and politician (1711–1761)

Admiral The Right Honourable Edward Boscawen
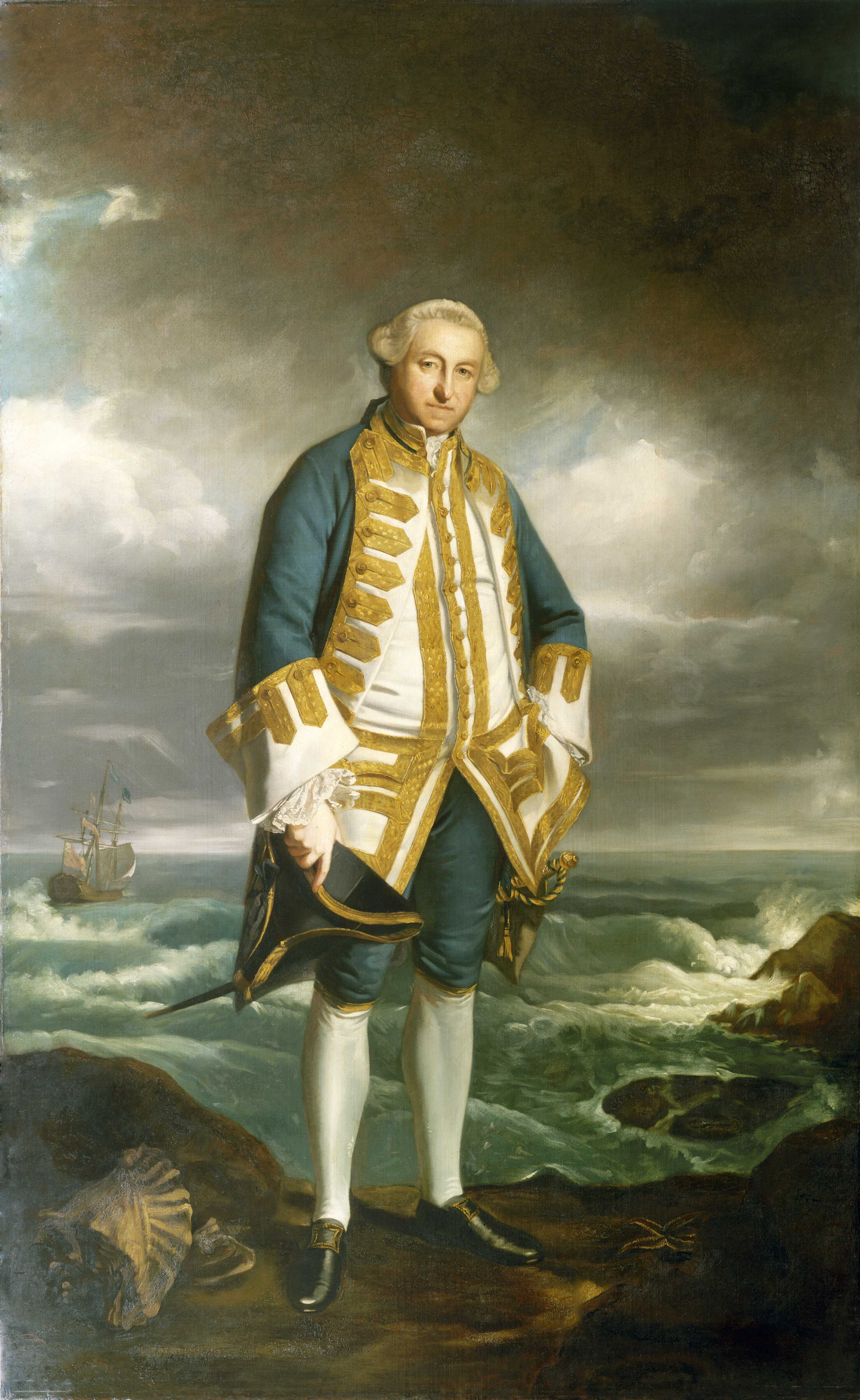
- Portrait by Sir Joshua Reynolds, c. 1755–1757
- Born: 19 August 1711; Tregothnan, Cornwall, England
- Died: 10 January 1761 (aged 49); Hatchlands Park, Surrey, England
- Burial place: St Michael Penkevil, Cornwall
- Relatives: Hugh Boscawen, 1st Viscount Falmouth; George Boscawen, 2nd Earl of Falmouth; George Evelyn Boscawen, 3rd Viscount Falmouth; Edward Boscawen, 4th Viscount Falmouth; Lieutenant General the Hon. George Boscawen
- Military career
- Allegiance: Great Britain
- Branch: Royal Navy
- Service years: 1723–1761
- Rank: Admiral of the Blue
- Nicknames: Old Dreadnought; Wry-necked Dick
- Commands: HMS Leopard; HMS Shoreham; HMS Prince Frederick; HMS Dreadnought; Commander-in-Chief, East Indies; Lord of the Admiralty Board; Commander-in-Chief, Mediterranean; Senior Naval Lord
- Conflicts: Anglo-Spanish War (1727–1729); War of Jenkins' Ear; Battle of Porto Bello; Battle of Cartagena de Indias; War of the Austrian Succession; Planned French invasion of Britain (1744); First Battle of Cape Finisterre (1747); Siege of Pondicherry (1748); Seven Years' War; Action of 8 June 1755; Siege of Louisbourg (1758); Battle of Lagos

Admiral of the Blue Edward Boscawen, PC (19 August 1711 – 10 January 1761) was a Royal Navy officer and politician. He is known principally for his various naval commands during the 18th century and the engagements that he won, including the Siege of Louisbourg in 1758 and Battle of Lagos in 1759. He is also remembered as the officer who signed the warrant authorising the execution of Admiral John Byng in 1757, for failing to engage the enemy at the Battle of Minorca (1756). In his political role, he served as a Member of Parliament for Truro from 1742 until his death in 1761 although, due to almost constant naval employment, he seems not to have been particularly active. He also served as one of the Lords Commissioners of the Admiralty on the Board of Admiralty from 1751 and as a member of the Privy Council from 1758 until his death.

== Early life ==
The Honourable Edward Boscawen was born in Tregothnan, Cornwall, England, on 19 August 1711, the third son of Hugh Boscawen, 1st Viscount Falmouth (1680–1734) by his wife Charlotte Godfrey (died 1754) elder daughter and co-heiress of Colonel Charles Godfrey, master of the jewel office by his wife Arabella Churchill, the King's mistress, and sister of John Churchill, 1st Duke of Marlborough.

The young Edward joined the navy at the age of 12 aboard HMS Superb of 60 guns. Superb was sent to the West Indies with Admiral Francis Hosier. Boscawen stayed with Superb for three years during the Anglo-Spanish War. He was subsequently reassigned to HMS Canterbury, HMS Hector, and HMS Namur under Admiral Sir Charles Wager and was aboard Namur when she sailed into Cádiz and Livorno following the Treaty of Seville that ended hostilities between Britain and Spain. On 25 May 1732 Boscawen was promoted lieutenant and in the August of the same year rejoined his old ship the 44-gun fourth-rate Hector in the Mediterranean. He remained with her until 16 October 1735 when he was promoted to the 70-gun HMS Grafton. On 12 March 1736 Boscawen was promoted by Admiral Sir John Norris to the temporary command of the 50-gun HMS Leopard. His promotion was confirmed by the Board of Admiralty. In June 1738 Boscawen was given command of HMS Shoreham, a small sixth-rate of 20 guns. He was ordered to accompany Admiral Edward Vernon to the West Indies in preparation for the oncoming war with Spain.

== War of Jenkins' Ear ==
=== Porto Bello ===
The War of Jenkins' Ear proved to be Boscawen's first opportunity for action and when Shoreham was declared unfit for service he volunteered to accompany Vernon and the fleet sent to attack Porto Bello.

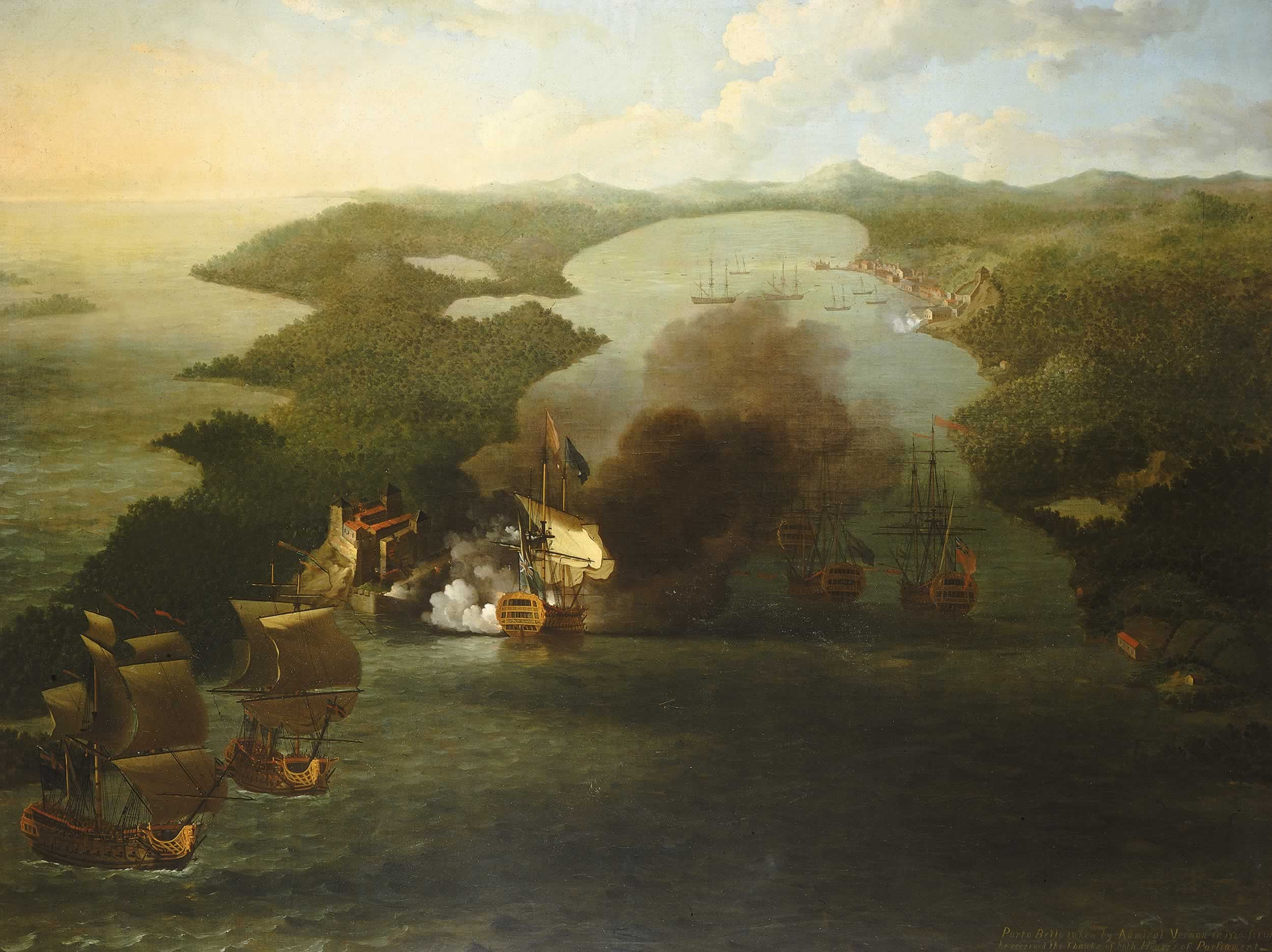
The Capture of Puerto Bello, by Samuel Scott, 1740

During the siege, Boscawen was ordered with Sir Charles Knowles to destroy the forts. The task took three weeks and 122 barrels of gunpowder to accomplish but the British levelled the forts surrounding the town. Vernon's achievement was hailed in Britain as an outstanding feat of arms and in the furore that surrounded the announcement the patriotic song "Rule, Britannia" was played for the first time. Streets were named after Porto Bello throughout Britain and its colonies. When the fleet returned to Port Royal, Jamaica Shoreham had been refitted and Boscawen resumed command of her.

=== Cartagena ===
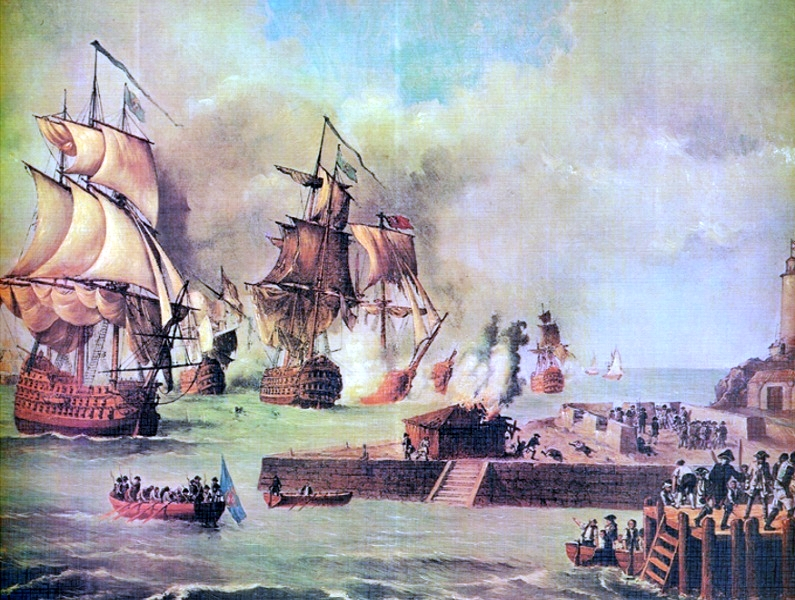
Attack at Cartagena de Indias by the British in 1741, oil on canvas, 18th century

In 1741 Boscawen was part of the fleet sent to attack another Caribbean port, Cartagena de Indias. Large reinforcements had been sent from Britain, including 8,000 soldiers who were landed to attack the chain of fortresses surrounding the Spanish colonial city. The Spanish had roughly 6,000 troops made up of regular soldiers, sailors and local loyalist natives. The siege lasted for over two months during which period the British troops suffered over 18,000 casualties, the vast majority from disease. Vernon's fleet suffered from dysentery, scurvy, yellow fever and other illnesses that were widespread throughout the Caribbean during the period. As a result of the battle Prime Minister Robert Walpole's government collapsed and George II removed his promise of support to the Austrians if the Prussians advanced into Silesia. The defeat of Vernon was a contributing factor to the increased hostilities of the War of the Austrian Succession. Boscawen had however distinguished himself once more. The land forces that he commanded had been instrumental in capturing Fort San Luis and Boca Chica Castle, and together with Knowles he destroyed the captured forts when the siege was abandoned. For his services he was promoted in May 1742 to the rank of captain and appointed to command the 70-gun Prince Frederick to replace Lord Aubrey Beauclerk who had died during the siege.

== War of the Austrian Succession ==
In 1742 Boscawen returned in Prince Frederick to England, where she was paid off and Boscawen joined the fleet commanded by Admiral Norris in the newly built 60-gun HMS Dreadnought. In the same year he was returned as a Member of Parliament for Truro, a position he held until his death. At the 1747 general election he was also returned for Saltash, but chose to continue to sit for Truro.

In 1744 the French attempted an invasion of England and Boscawen was with the fleet under Admiral Norris when the French fleet were sighted. The French under Admiral Rocquefeuil retreated and the British attempts to engage were confounded by a violent storm that swept the English Channel.

Whilst cruising the Channel, Boscawen had the good fortune to capture the French frigate Médée. She was the first capture of an enemy ship made during the War of Austrian Succession and was commanded by M. de Hocquart. Médée was sold and became a successful privateer, commanded by George Walker.

At the end of 1744 Boscawen was given command of HMS Royal Sovereign, guard ship at the Nore anchorage. He commanded her until 1745 when he was appointed to another of his old ships, HMS Namur, that had been reduced (razéed) from 90 guns to 74 guns. He was appointed to command a small squadron under Vice-Admiral Martin in the Channel.

=== First Battle of Cape Finisterre ===
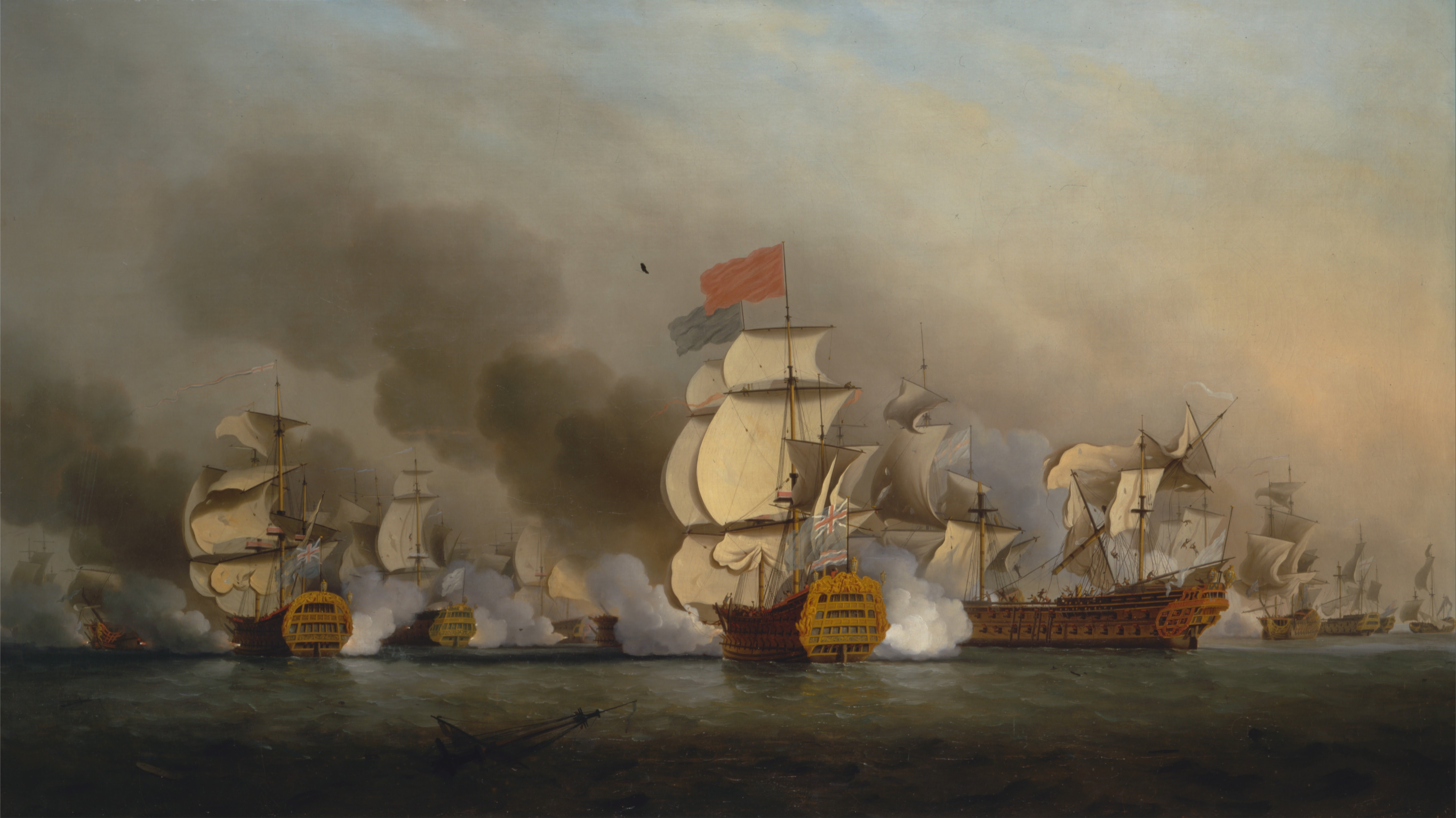
Lord Anson's Victory off Cape Finisterre, 1747, by Samuel Scott

In 1747 Boscawen was ordered to join Admiral Anson and took an active part in the first Battle of Cape Finisterre. The British fleet sighted the French fleet on 3 May. The French fleet under Admiral de la Jonquière was convoying its merchant fleet to France and the British attacked. The French fleet was almost completely annihilated with all but two of the escorts taken and six merchantmen. Boscawen was injured in the shoulder during the battle by a musket ball. Once more the French captain, M. de Hocquart became Boscawen's prisoner and was taken to England.

=== Command in India ===
Boscawen was promoted rear-admiral of the blue on 15 July 1747 and was appointed to command a joint operation being sent to the East Indies. With his flag in Namur, and with five other line of battle ships, a few smaller men of war, and a number of transports Boscawen sailed from England on 4 November 1747. On the outward voyage Boscawen made an abortive attempt to capture Mauritius by surprise but was driven off by French forces. Boscawen continued on arriving at Fort St. David near the town of Cuddalore on 29 July 1748 and took over command from Admiral Griffin. Boscawen had been ordered to capture and destroy the main French settlement in India at Pondichéry. Factors such as Boscawen's lack of knowledge and experience of land offensives, the failings of the engineers and artillery officers under his command, a lack of secrecy surrounding the operation and the skill of the French governor Joseph François Dupleix combined to thwart the attack. The British forces amounting to some 5,000 men captured and destroyed the outlying fort of Aranciopang. This capture was the only success of the operation and after failing to breach the walls of the city the British forces withdrew. Amongst the combatants were a young ensign Robert Clive, later known as Clive of India and Major Stringer Lawrence, later Commander-in-Chief, India. Lawrence was captured by the French during the retreat and exchanged after the news of the Treaty of Aix-la-Chapelle had reached India. Over the monsoon season Boscawen remained at Fort St David. Fortunately, for the Admiral and his staff, when a storm hit the British outpost Boscawen was ashore but his flagship Namur went down with over 600 men aboard.

Boscawen returned to England in 1750. In 1751 Anson became First Lord of the Admiralty and asked Boscawen to serve on the Admiralty Board. Boscawen remained one of the Lord Commissioners of the Admiralty until his death.

== Seven Years' War ==
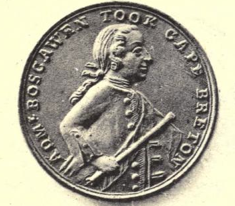
Edward Boscawen Medal: Siege of Louisbourg (1758)

On 4 February 1755 Boscawen was promoted vice admiral and given command of a squadron on the North American Station. A squadron of partially disarmed French ships of the line were dispatched to Canada loaded with reinforcements and Boscawen was ordered to intercept them. The French ambassador to London, the Duc de Mirepoix had informed the government of George II that any act of hostility taken by British ships would be considered an act of war. Thick fog both obstructed Boscawen's reconnaissance and scattered the French ships, but on 8 June Boscawen's squadron sighted the Alcide, Lys and Dauphin Royal off Cape Ray off Newfoundland. In the ensuing engagement the British captured the Alcide and Lys but the Dauphin Royal escaped into the fog. Amongst the 1,500 men made prisoner was the captain of the Alcide. For M. de Hocquart it was the third time that Boscawen had fought him and taken his ship. Pay amounting to £80,000 was captured aboard the Lys. Boscawen, as vice-admiral commanding the squadron, would have been entitled to a sizeable share in the prize money. The British squadron headed for Halifax to regroup but a fever spread through the ships and the Vice-admiral was forced to return to England.

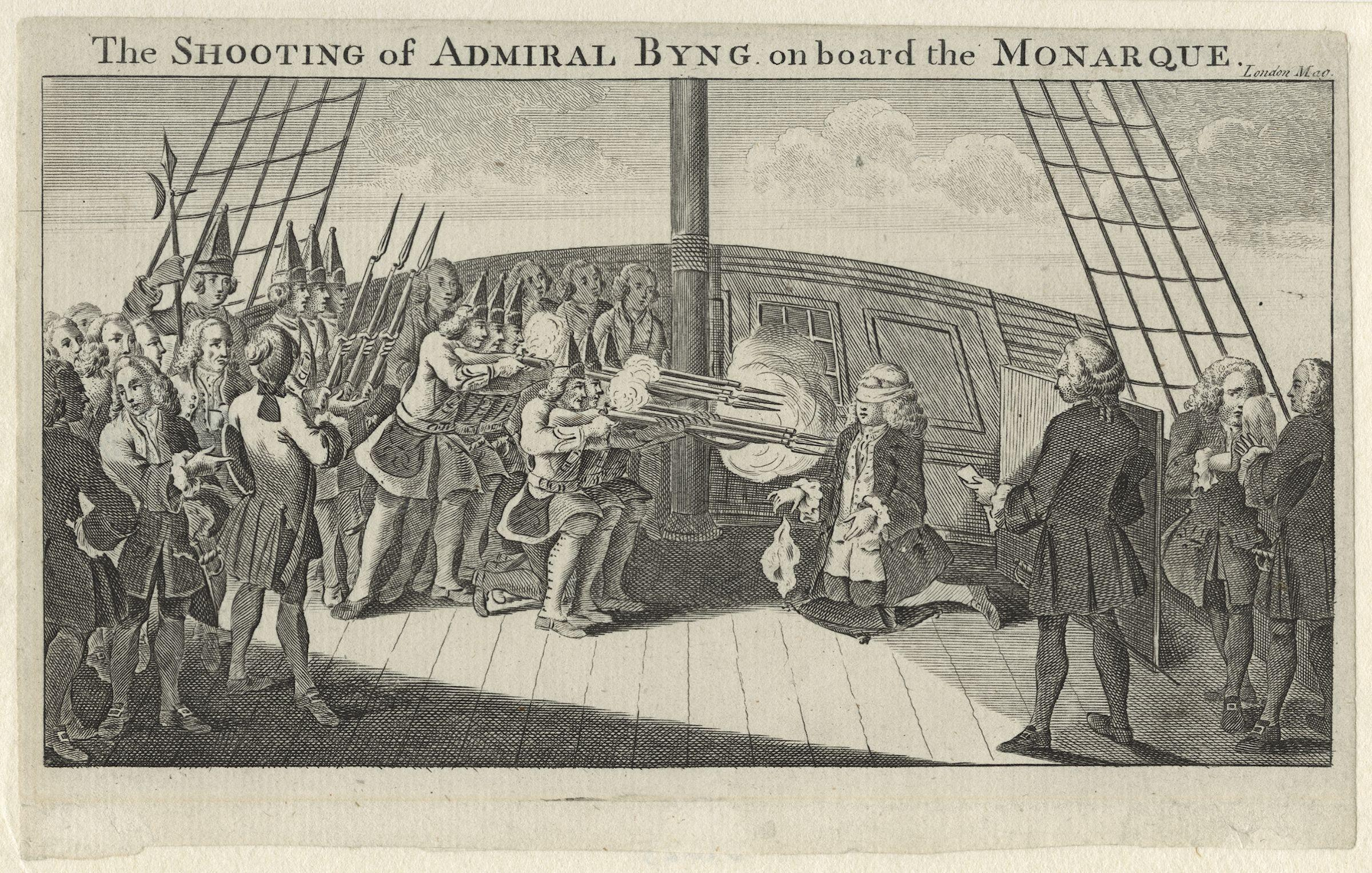
The Execution of Admiral John Byng aboard HMS Monarch

Boscawen returned to the Channel Fleet and was commander-in-chief Portsmouth during the trial of Admiral John Byng. Boscawen signed the order of execution after the King had refused to grant the unfortunate admiral a pardon. Boscawen was advanced to Senior Naval Lord on the Admiralty Board in November 1756 but then stood down (as Senior Naval Lord although he remained on the Board) in April 1757, during the caretaker ministry, before being advanced to Senior Naval Lord again in July 1757.

=== Siege of Louisburg ===
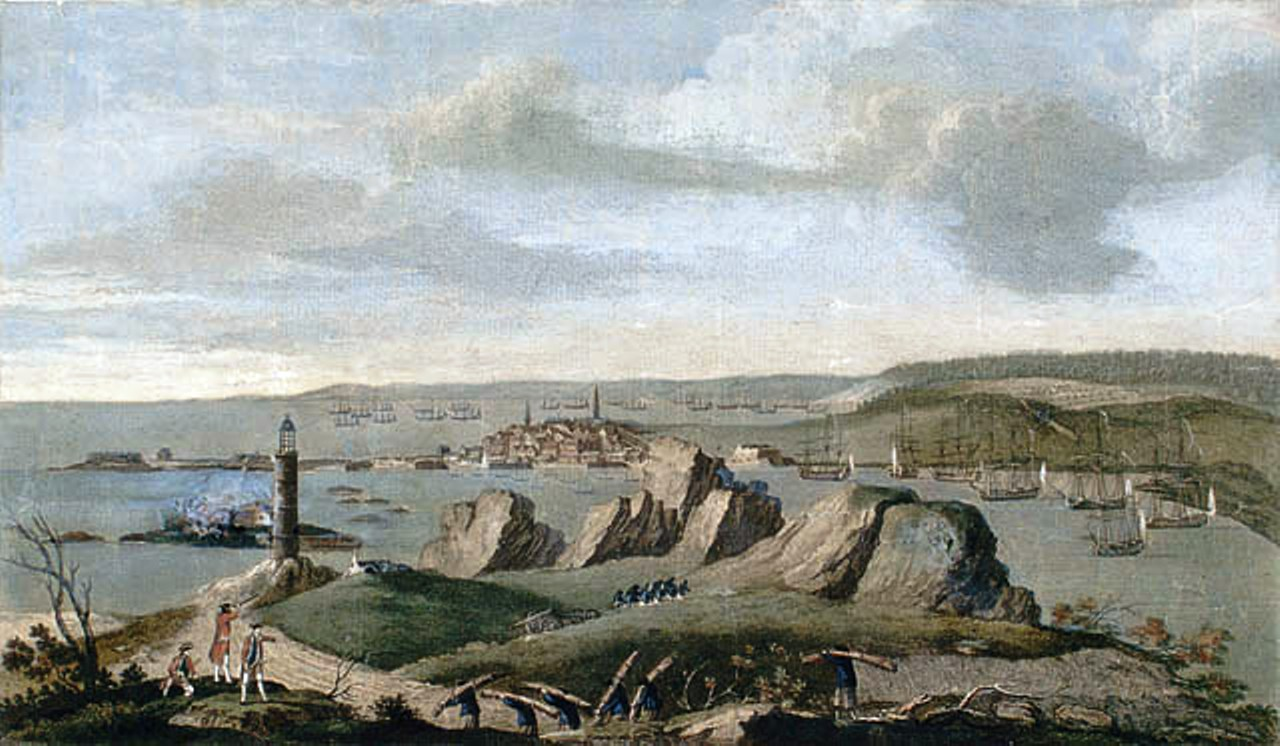
The Siege of Louisburg, 1758

In October 1757 Boscawen was second in command under Admiral Edward Hawke. On 7 February 1758 Boscawen was promoted to Admiral of the blue squadron. and ordered to take a fleet to North America. Once there, he took naval command at the siege of Louisburg during June and July 1758. On this occasion rather than entrust the land assault to a naval commander, the army was placed under the command of General Jeffrey Amherst and Brigadier James Wolfe. The siege of Louisburg was one of the key contributors to the capture of French possessions in Canada. Wolfe later would use Louisburg as a staging point for the siege of Quebec. The capture of the town deprived the French of the only effective naval base that they had in Canada, as well as leading to the destruction of four of their ships of the line and the capture of another. On his return from North America Boscawen was awarded the Thanks of both Houses of Parliament for his service. The King made Boscawen a Privy Counsellor in recognition for his continued service both as a member of the Board of Admiralty and commander-in-chief.

=== Battle of Lagos ===
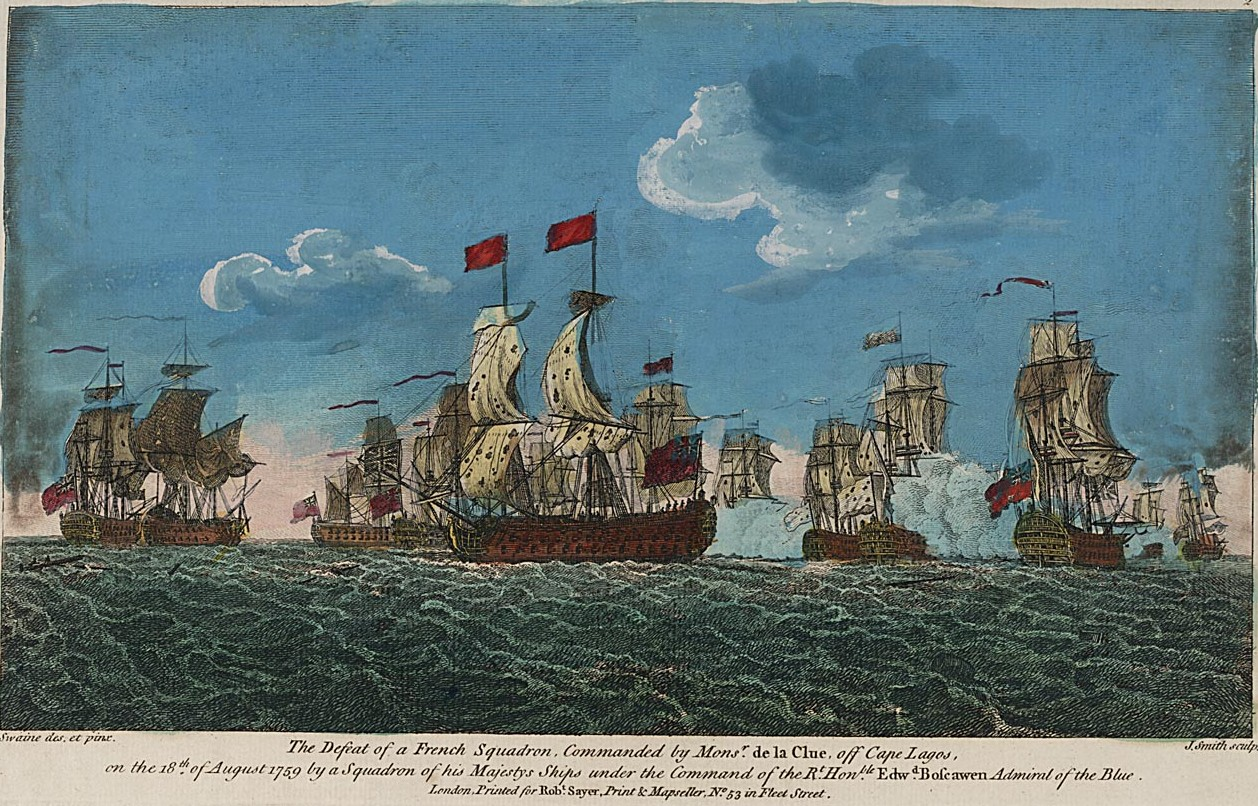
The Battle of Lagos, 1759, by Francis Swaine

In April 1759 Boscawen took command of a fleet bound for the Mediterranean. His aim was to prevent another planned invasion of Britain by the French. With his flag aboard the newly constructed HMS Namur of 90 guns he blockaded Toulon and kept the fleet of Admiral de le Clue-Sabran in port. In order to tempt the French out of port, Boscawen sent three of his ships to bombard the port. The guns of the batteries surrounding the town drove off the British ships. Having sustained damage in the action and due to the constant weathering of ships on blockade duty Boscawen took his fleet to Gibraltar to refit and resupply. On 17 August a frigate that had been ordered to watch the Straits of Gibraltar signalled that the French fleet were in sight. Boscawen took his available ships to sea to engage de la Clue. During the night the British chased the French fleet and five of de la Clue's ships managed to separate from the fleet and escape. The others were driven in to a bay near Lagos, Portugal. The British overhauled the remaining seven ships of the French fleet and engaged. The French line of battle ship Centaur began a duel with Namur but was outgunned and struck her colours. The damage aboard Namur forced Boscawen to shift his flag to HMS Newark of 80 guns. Whilst transferring between ships, the small boat that Boscawen was in was hit by an enemy cannonball. Boscawen took off his wig and plugged the hole. Two more French ships, Souverain and Guerrier escaped during the second night and on the morning of 19 August the British captured Téméraire and Modeste and drove the French flagship Océan and Redoutable ashore where they foundered and were set on fire by their crews to stop the British from taking them off and repairing them. The five French ships that avoided the battle made their way to Cádiz where Boscawen ordered Admiral Thomas Broderick to blockade the port.

== Final years, death, and legacy ==
Boscawen returned to England, where he was promoted General of Marines in recognition of his service. He was given the Freedom of the City of Edinburgh. Admiral Boscawen returned to sea for the final time and took his station off the west coast of France around Quiberon Bay. After a violent attack of what was later diagnosed as Typhoid fever, the Admiral came ashore, where, on 10 January 1761, he died at his home in Hatchlands Park in Surrey. His body was taken to St. Michael's Church in St Michael Penkevil, Cornwall, where he was buried. The monument was designed by Robert Adam and sculpted by John Michael Rysbrack. The monument at the church begins:

Here lies the Right Honourable
Edward Boscawen,
Admiral of the Blue, General of Marines,
Lord of the Admiralty, and one of his
Majesty's most Honourable Privy Council.
His birth, though noble,
His titles, though illustrious,
Were but incidental additions to his greatness.

William Pitt, 1st Earl of Chatham and Prime Minister once said to Boscawen: "When I apply to other Officers respecting any expedition I may chance to project, they always raise difficulties, you always find expedients."

=== Legacy ===
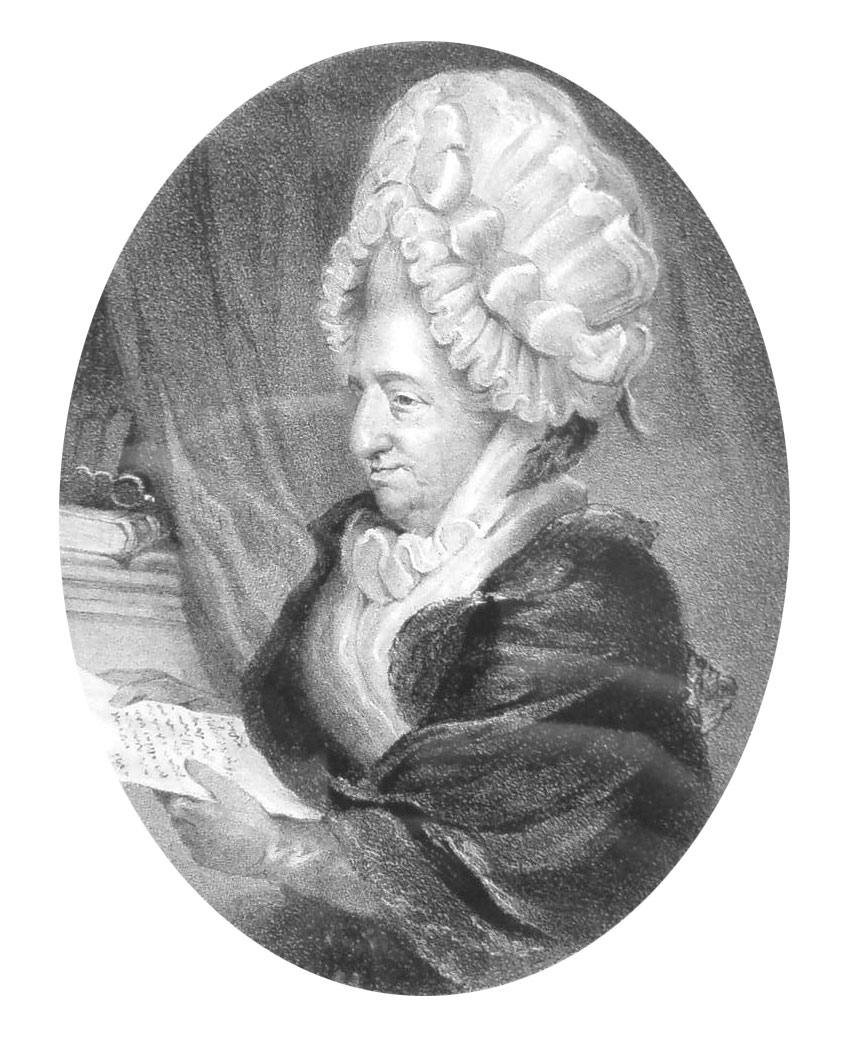
Frances Evelyn Boscawen née Glanville (9 June 1719 – 25 February 1805)

The town of Boscawen, New Hampshire is named after him. Two ships and a stone frigate of the Royal Navy have borne the name HMS Boscawen, after Admiral Boscawen, whilst another ship was planned but the plans were shelved before she was commissioned. The stone frigate was a training base for naval cadets and in consequence three ships were renamed HMS Boscawen whilst being used as the home base for the training establishment.

=== Quotes ===
Boscawen was quoted as saying "To be sure I lose the fruits of the earth, but then, I am gathering the flowers of the Sea" (1756) and "Never fire, my lads, till you see the whites of the Frenchmen's eyes."

== Frances Evelyn Boscawen ==
In 1742 Boscawen married Frances Evelyn Glanville (1719–1805), with whom he had three sons and two daughters, and who became an important hostess of Bluestocking meetings after his death. The elder daughter, Frances, married John Leveson-Gower; the younger, Elizabeth, married Henry Somerset, 5th Duke of Beaufort.

== Sources ==
- Ballard, G. A. (1980). The Black Battlefleet. Annapolis, Maryland: Naval Institute Press. ISBN 0-87021-924-3.
- Rodger, N. A. M. (1979). The Admiralty. Offices of State. Lavenham: T. Dalton Ltd. ISBN 0900963948.
- Rodger, N. A. M. (2006). Command of the Ocean: A Naval History of Britain, 1649–1815. Penguin Books. ISBN 978-0141026909.
- Stewart, William (2009). Admirals of the World: A Biographical Dictionary, 1500 to the Present. McFarland & Co. ISBN 978-0-7864-3809-9.

Parliament of Great Britain
Preceded by James Hammond; Charles Hamilton	Member of Parliament for Truro; 1741–1761; With: Charles Hamilton 1741–1747; John Boscawen 1747–1761	Succeeded by Lt General the Hon. George Boscawen; John Boscawen
Military offices
Preceded by Sir William Rowley	Senior Naval Lord; 1756–1757	Succeeded by Sir William Rowley
Preceded by Sir William Rowley	Senior Naval Lord; 1757–1761	Succeeded by John Forbes
