= HMS Ambuscade (1746) =

Frigate of the Royal Navy

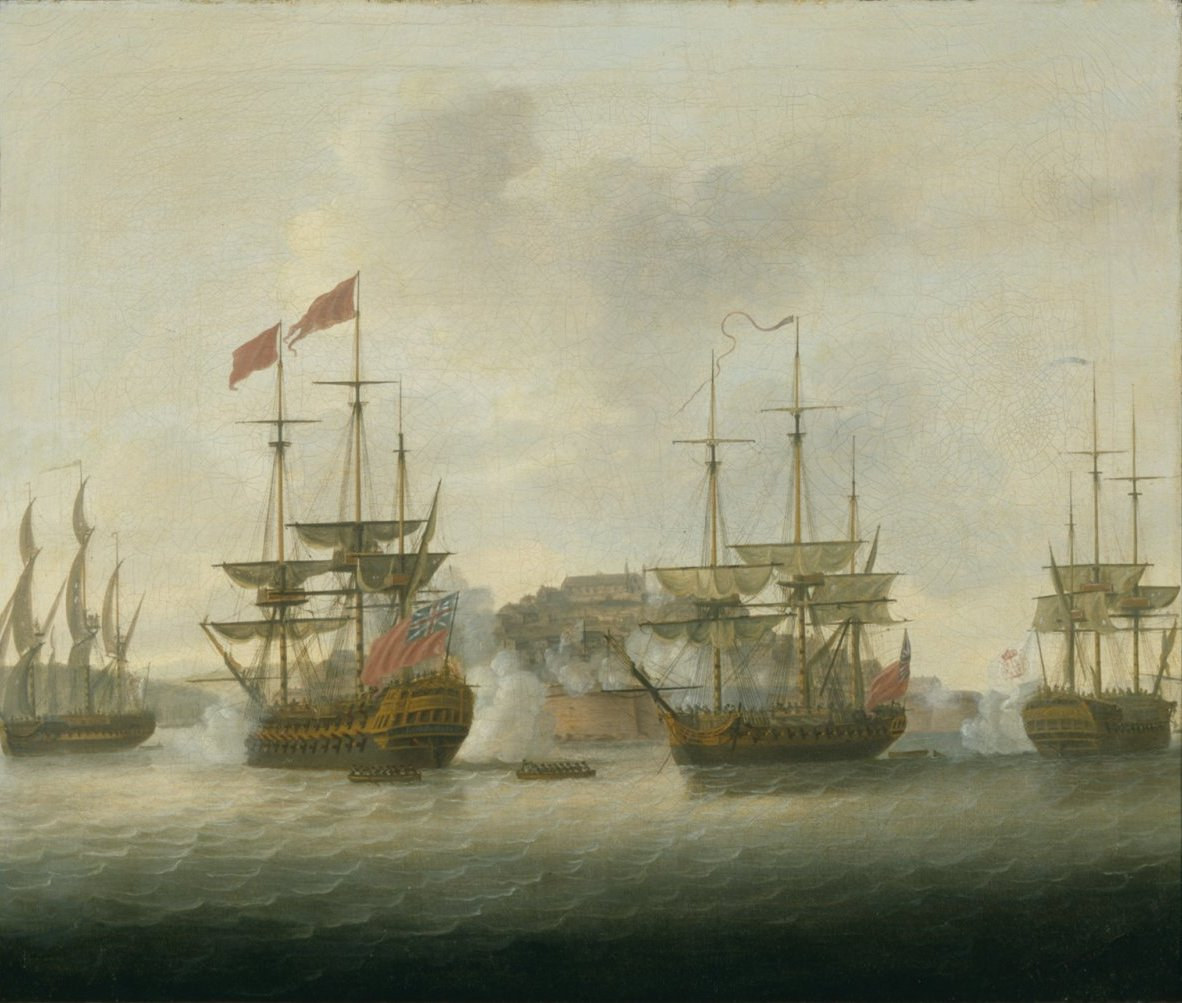
- Ambuscade (second from right) during the First Cevallos expedition

History

France
- Name: Embuscade
- Builder: Le Havre
- Laid down: November 1744
- Launched: 19 March 1745
- Completed: July 1745
- Captured: By the Royal Navy on 21 April 1746

Great Britain
- Name: HMS Ambuscade
- Acquired: 21 April 1746
- Fate: Sold to private adventurers on 9 February 1762

General characteristics
- Class & type: 40-gun fifth rate frigate
- Displacement: 1090 tonneaux
- Tons burthen: 450 port tonneaux; 740 72/94 bm
- Length: 132 ft 6 in (40.4 m) (overall); 107 ft 5.5 in (32.8 m) (keel)
- Beam: 36 ft (11.0 m)
- Depth of hold: 10 ft 6 in (3.20 m)
- Sail plan: Full-rigged ship
- Complement: 250
- Armament: Upper deck: 26 × 12-pounders; Quarterdeck: 10 × 6-pounders; Forecastle: 4 × 6-pounders

HMS Ambuscade was a 40-gun fifth rate frigate of the Royal Navy. She had formerly been the French ship Embuscade, captured in 1746.

Embuscade was a one-off 38-gun design by Pierre Chaillé, with 26 × 8-pounder and 12 × 4-pounder guns and was launched at Le Havre on 19 March 1745. She was captured in the English Channel by HMS Defiance on 21 April 1746.

Ambuscade fought at the First Battle of Cape Finisterre on 3 May 1747, commanded by Captain John Montagu. She captured the privateer Vainqueen on 12 July 1757, and fought with Edward Boscawen against Jean-François de La Clue-Sabran at the Battle of Lagos on 19 August 1759. She was sold at Deptford in 1762 to private adventurers.
