= HMS Warspite (1758) =

Ship, 1758

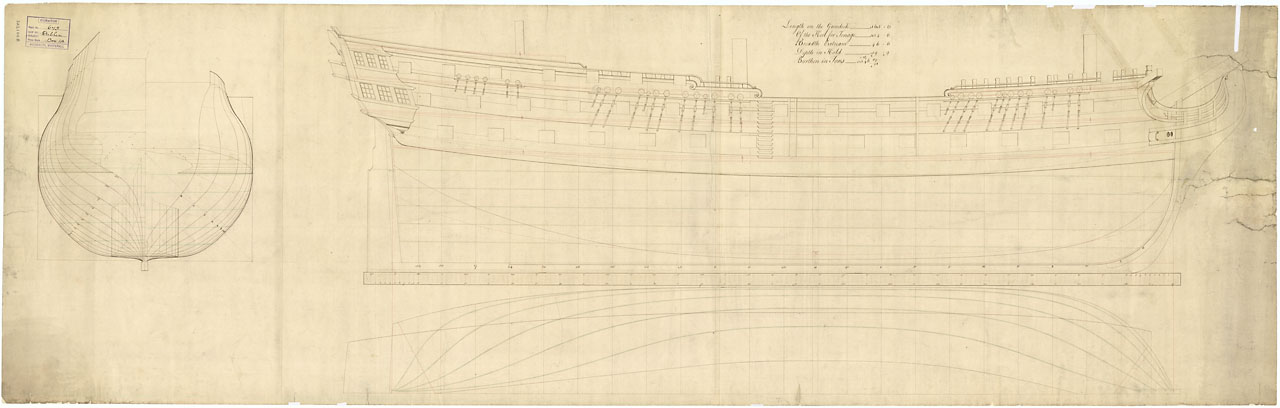
- Warspite

History

Great Britain
- Name: HMS Warspite
- Ordered: 14 November 1755
- Builder: Thomas West, Deptford
- Laid down: November 1755
- Launched: 8 April 1758
- Commissioned: May 1758
- Fate: Broken up at Portsmouth Dockyard, November 1801
- Notes: Harbour service from 1778

General characteristics
- Class & type: Dublin-class ship of the line
- Tons burthen: 1579 84/94 bm
- Length: 165 ft 9.5 in (50.533 m) (gundeck); 134 ft 11 in (41.12 m) (gundeck)
- Beam: 46 ft 11 in (14.30 m)
- Depth of hold: 19 ft 9 in (6.02 m)
- Sail plan: Full-rigged ship
- Armament: 74 guns: Gundeck: 28 × 32 pdrs; Upper gundeck: 28 × 18 pdrs; Quarterdeck: 14 × 9 pdrs; Forecastle: 4 × 9 pdrs

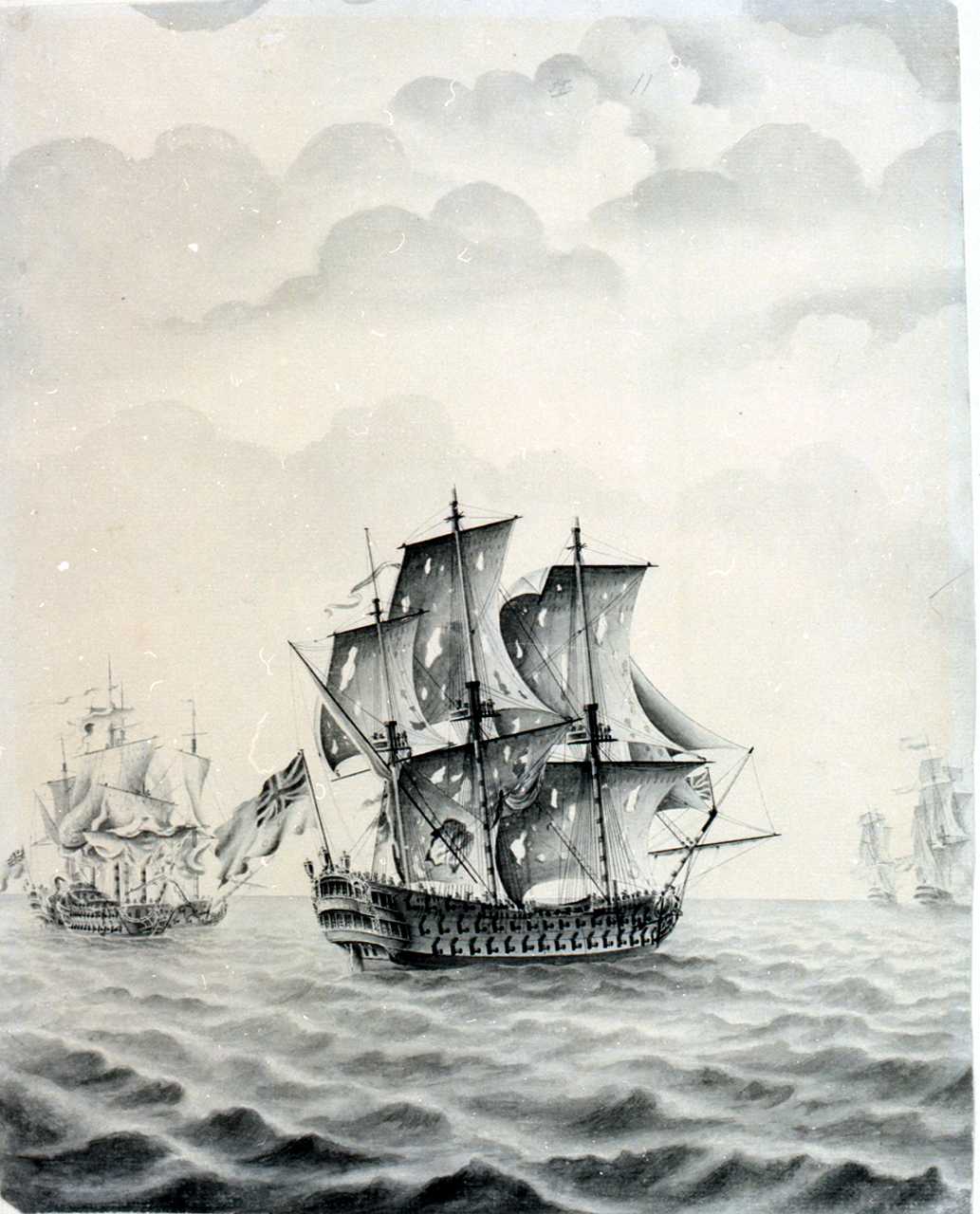
Portrait of the English ship Warspite, 74 guns, sketched by John Hood

HMS Warspite was a 74-gun third rate ship of the line (a new class of two-decker that formed the backbone of British fleets) of the Royal Navy, launched on 8 April 1758 at Thomas West's private shipyard in Deptford.

Her first service in the Seven Years' War against France was as one of Admiral Edward Boscawen's 14 ships in the Mediterranean, and on 19 August 1759 she took part in the Battle of Lagos, where she captured the French Téméraire. Warspite also participated in the Battle of Quiberon Bay under Admiral Sir Edward Hawke.

After the signing of the Treaty of Paris she was paid off on 5 May 1763, reappearing as a hospital ship during the American Revolutionary War (1775–83).

She was employed on harbour service from 1778. She was renamed Arundel in March 1800, and was eventually broken up at Portsmouth Dockyard in November 1801.
