= HMS America (1757) =

Ship of the line of the Royal Navy

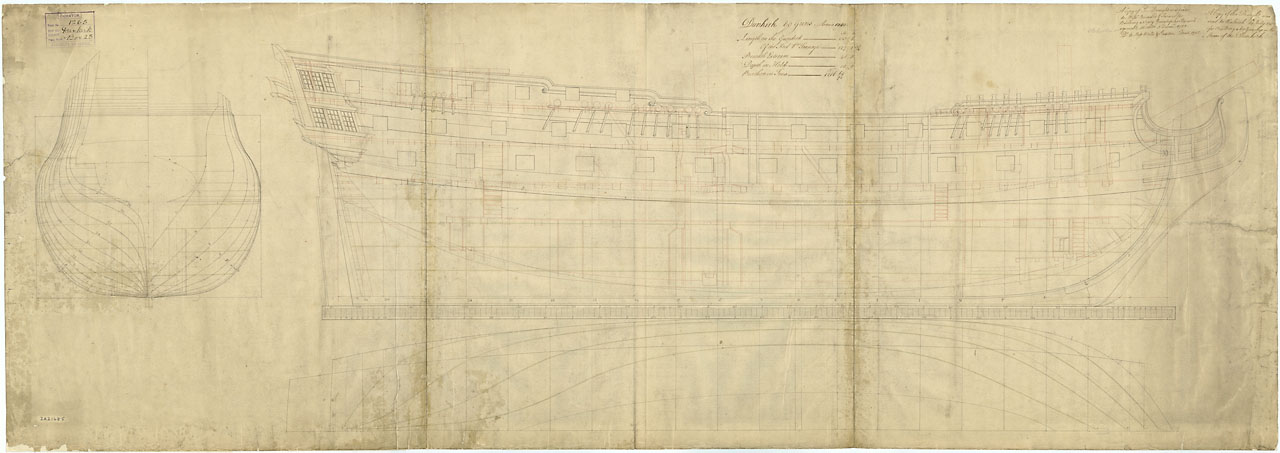
- America

History

Great Britain
- Name: HMS America
- Ordered: 24 November 1755
- Builder: Wells & Stanton, Rotherhithe
- Laid down: December 1755
- Launched: 21 May 1757
- Commissioned: April 1757
- Decommissioned: August 1764
- Honours and awards: Battle of Lagos, 1759
- Fate: Broken up at Plymouth Dockyard, 1771

General characteristics
- Class & type: 60-gun fourth rate ship of the line
- Tons burthen: 124847/94 (bm)
- Length: 154 ft 0 in (46.94 m) (gundeck); 127 ft 5 in (38.84 m) (keel)
- Beam: 42 ft 11 in (13.08 m)
- Depth of hold: 18 ft 9 in (5.72 m)
- Propulsion: Sails
- Sail plan: Full-rigged ship
- Armament: 60 guns: Gundeck: 24 × 24-pounders; Upper gundeck: 26 × 12-pounders; Quarterdeck: 8 × 6-pounders; Forecastle: 2 × 6-pounders

HMS America was a 60-gun fourth rate ship of the line of the Royal Navy, built for service during the Seven Years' War against France and Spain. Commissioned in 1757, America was assigned to the British fleets blockading French ports in the Atlantic and Mediterranean and played an active role in the Battle of Lagos in 1759. After a refit in 1760, she was sailed to the East Indies for combat against Spanish forces in the Philippines. America was returned to England at the end of the war, and was broken up in 1771.

== Seven Years' War ==
America was stationed off the southwestern coast of England throughout the winter of 1757–1758, on patrol for French privateers. On 9 December she recaptured John Galley, an English Merchantman from the port of Bolton which had been seized by French. With the assistance of a prize crew from America, the recaptured vessel was sailed to Plymouth for return to her original owners. America remained at her station, and on 18 December captured a French merchantman, Neptune, bearing a load of fish. The French crew were held aboard as prisoners, and the vessel sent into Plymouth as a prize.

"We came up with a French Snow who, in firing her stern chase at Brilliant, which was very near her, by some accident took fire in her power room and blew up all the after part of her. She burnt with great violence for half an hour, and then sunk."

— Extract of a letter Captain Byron, America, describing the destruction of a French snow encountered off the English coast on 19 December 1757.

An engagement on the following day proved less successful for America's crew. In the morning of 19 December the ship was in company with HMS Brilliant when they came within range of Diamond a 14-gun French snow carrying a cargo of Quebecois furs. The French vessel turned to flee, firing her stern chasers at Brilliant as she went. Shortly afterward the cannon fire ignited the snow's powder magazine and she exploded and sank. Only 24 of her 70 crew escaped the wreck to be rescued by the British vessels, and most of these subsequently died of their burns. Four days later, America ran across another French privateer, the 24-gun Dragon, and defeated her after a 90-minute battle.

From 1758 to 1760, America was under the command of a Captain James Kirke.

She was broken up in 1771.
