= HMS Culloden (1747) =

Ship of the line of the Royal Navy

- A 161 ft 74-gun two-decker third rate, possibly Culloden

History

Great Britain
- Name: HMS Culloden
- Ordered: 31 December 1744
- Builder: Deptford Dockyard
- Launched: 9 September 1747
- Fate: Sold, 29 June 1770

General characteristics
- Class & type: 1741 proposals 74-gun third-rate ship of the line
- Tons burthen: 1487 bm
- Length: 161 ft (49.1 m) (gundeck)
- Beam: 46 ft (14.0 m)
- Depth of hold: 19 ft 4 in (5.9 m)
- Propulsion: Sails
- Sail plan: Full-rigged ship
- Armament: 74 guns: Gundeck: 28 × 32 pdrs; Upper gundeck: 28 × 18 pdrs; Quarterdeck: 14 × 9 pdrs; Forecastle: 4 × 9 pdrs

HMS Culloden was a 74-gun third-rate ship of the line of the Royal Navy, built according to the dimensions laid out by the 1741 proposals of the 1719 Establishment at Deptford Dockyard, and launched on 9 September 1747. She was the first ship to bear the name, and was named for the Battle of Culloden, which had been fought the previous year.

== Construction ==
Culloden was the first British 74-gun ship built since HMS Edgar in 1668. Her dimensions matched those of an Establishment 80-gun ship, but she was pierced with more gunports on her gundecks. She was also the smallest 74 of the eighteenth century, and was not considered a particularly successful ship by those who served in her.

== Navy service ==
In an early mishap Culloden was run aground in Spithead in March 1748, while attempting to enter Portsmouth Harbour in company with HMS Ambuscade and HMS Bristol. The ship remained aground until she was lightened by offloading her guns, after which she was able to float free on the tide. She departed Spithead the following day.

"... They gained great honour in bravely and resolutely withstanding, for near three hours, the continual firing from numberless batteries; some they did and others they could not see. They have a great many men killed or wounded ... the Culloden is in a most shattered condition."

— Extract of a 1759 letter describing Culloden and other vessels in action off the French port of Toulon.

Culloden saw active service during the Seven Years' War, including as part of Britain's ongoing blockade of the French port of Toulon in 1759. On 7 June 1759 she was sent close to the port as part of an attempt to burn two French ships that had taken shelter there. The attack was unsuccessful and Culloden was reported to be "most shattered" by French gunfire.

She was sold on 29 June 1770, after 23 years in service.
