= History of the French Navy from 1715 to 1789 =

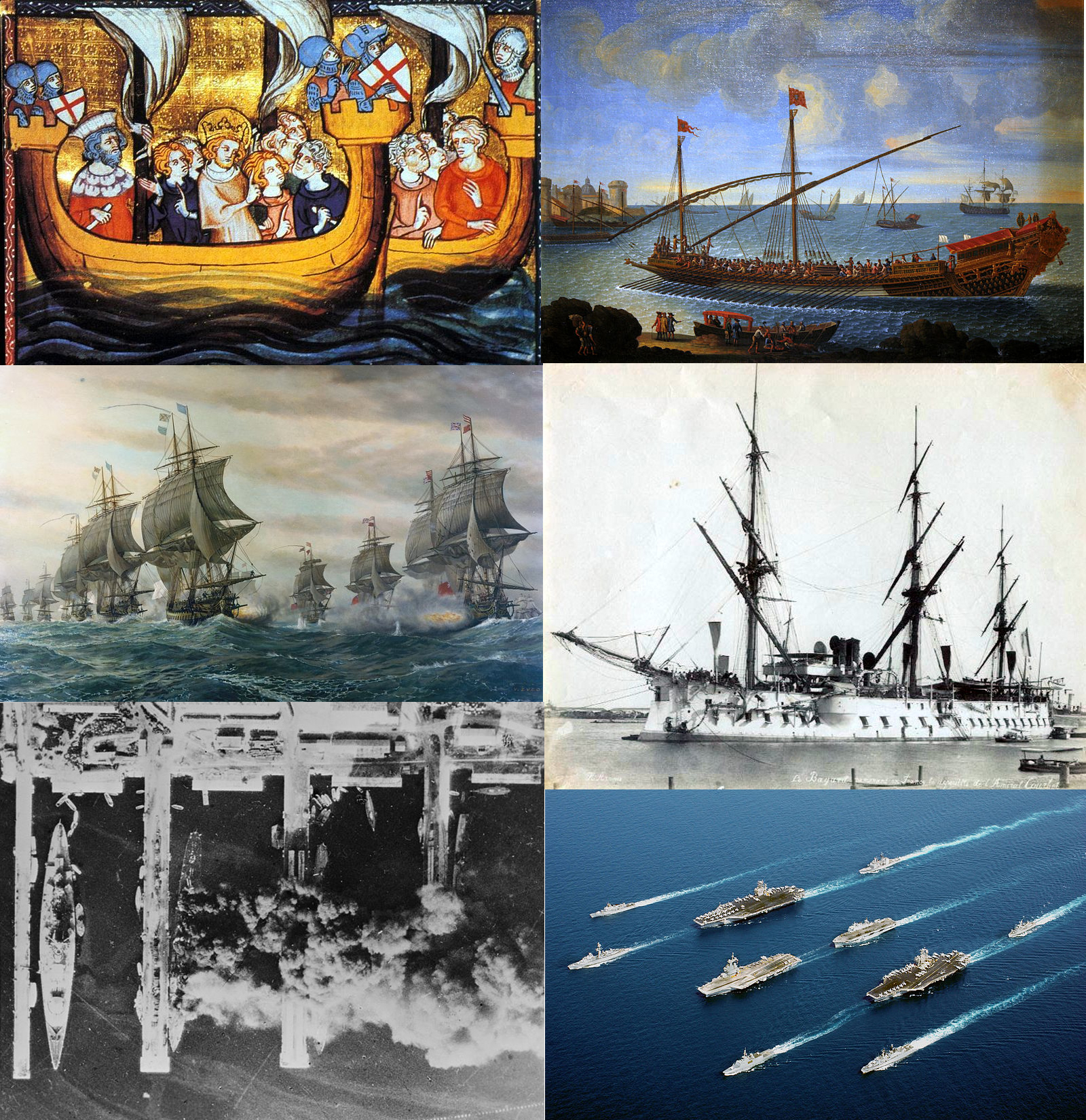
French military navy, from the Middle Ages to the 20th century.

The history of the French Navy from 1715 to 1789 traces the development of the Royal Navy, which established itself as a permanent force in the 16th century.

In 1715, following budgetary constraints and earlier conflicts, notably the War of the Spanish Succession, the Royal Navy began a reconstruction phase between 1720 and 1740, introducing significant technical innovations.

Under Louis XV, alongside the Kingdom of Great Britain, the French government prioritized maintaining peace. This policy limited naval investments, restricted the number of ships, and reduced training opportunities for crews, who were often assigned to coastal missions or limited patrols.

The War of the Austrian Succession (1744-1748) demonstrated a relative balance of naval forces, but the Seven Years' War (1756-1763) proved disastrous, resulting in the loss of the first French colonial empire—including Canada, eastern Louisiana, and parts of India—which significantly weakened the fleet. Louis XVI ordered a comprehensive reorganization of the Royal Navy. By 1782, the naval budget exceeded that of the army, reflecting the strategic importance of maritime power in the context of global rivalry with Great Britain. This period also saw the standardization of ships and the development of port-arsenals. Despite these advancements, France remained primarily a land-based power. However, its economy increasingly embraced maritimization, driven by thriving trade in the West Indies and the activities of the French East India Company.

== Louis XV ==
=== Innovations ===
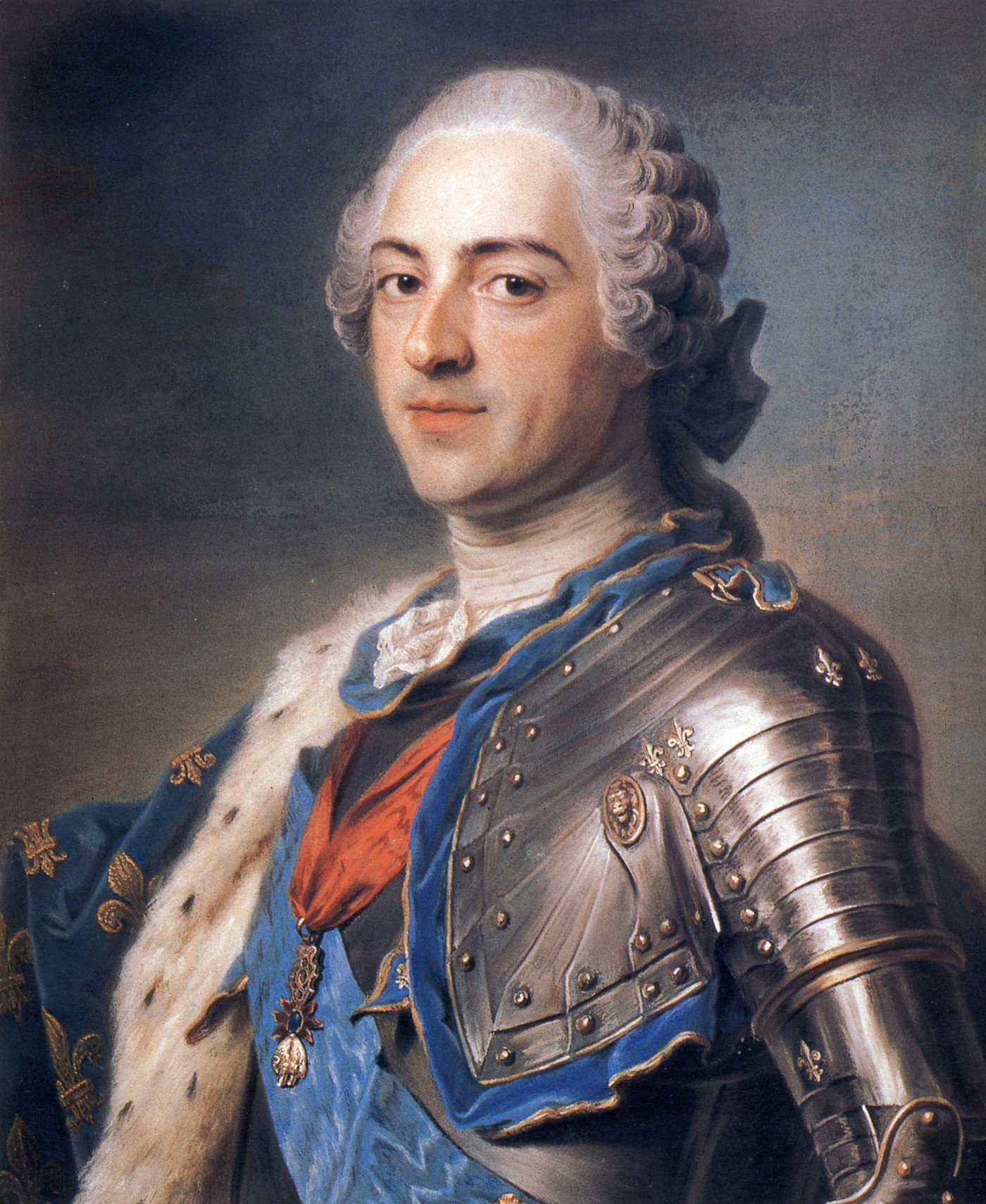
Louis XV prioritized peace, limiting naval funding.

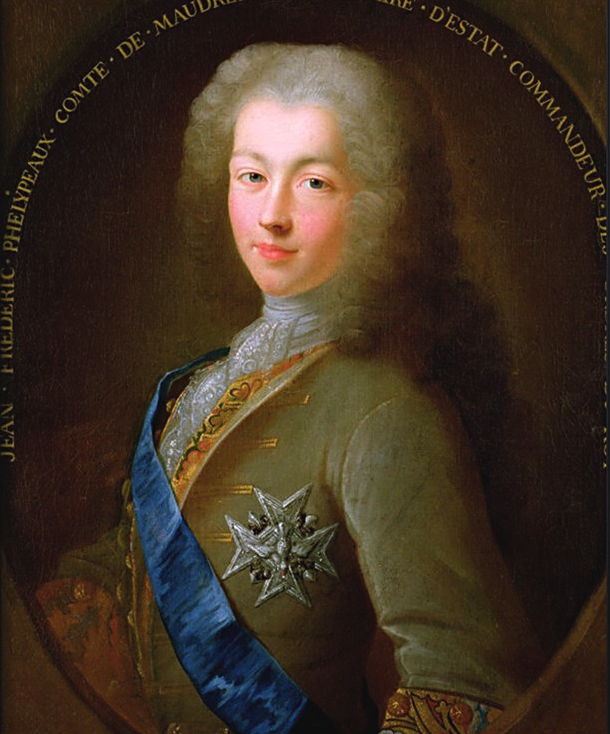
Maurepas, Minister of the Navy, modernized the fleet.

During the Régence and Louis XV's minority, the Royal Navy faced a severe budgetary crisis, inherited from Louis XIV’s costly wars and the Treaties of Utrecht (1713), which diminished French maritime influence. Naval expenditures, capped at 5-6% of the state budget, proved insufficient to maintain an operational fleet. Ships, often left abandoned in ports, deteriorated due to moisture and marine parasites. The arsenals at Brest, Toulon, and Rochefort suffered from chronic under-maintenance, with outdated infrastructure, cluttered slipways, and insufficient stocks of timber, ropes, and canvas. In 1721, the fleet included only 31 seaworthy ships, far below the 51 planned for 1729, with many units obsolete and their armaments inferior to British or Dutch standards. Maurepas, appointed Minister of the Navy in 1723 at age 22, pursued ambitious modernization despite these constraints. Recognizing the Royal Navy’s technical superiority, he employed industrial espionage, a common practice at the time. He dispatched agents like Blaise Geslain and Blaise Ollivier to England and the United Provinces to study foreign shipbuilding techniques. These covert missions provided detailed ship plans, optimized carpentry methods, and innovations in armament, such as smoother-bore cannons with improved accuracy. Concurrently, Maurepas promoted the application of science to naval operations, notably through the work of Duhamel du Monceau, a scholar who published foundational treatises on shipbuilding, material strength, timber preservation, and forest management for naval purposes. These works enhanced oak selection for hulls and extended ship lifespans. Officers, trained in schools at Lorient, Toulon, or Le Havre, compensated for limited practical experience with robust theoretical training in navigation, mathematics, astronomy, geometry, and naval tactics, provided by increasingly structured institutions that foreshadowed future naval academies.

=== Reconstruction attempts ===
In 1720, the average age of French ships reached 24 years, rendering the fleet obsolete compared to the Royal Navy, which benefited from regular maintenance, a naval budget comprising nearly 20% of British military expenditures, and a deeply ingrained maritime tradition. Two reconstruction campaigns (1722-1724 and 1727-1728) facilitated the launch of 20 ships and 10 frigates, but these efforts failed to close the gap accumulated since Louis XIV’s reign. The Royal Navy remained limited, unable to mobilize its strength for long-range strategic projections or match the Royal Navy in operational ship numbers. Limited expeditions, such as the one against Tripoli in 1728 to suppress Barbary piracy, achieved success but did not address the lack of crew training. Deep-sea exercises, essential for refining combat tactics and fleet cohesion, remained rare, as ships were often disarmed to reduce costs. Sailors, recruited mainly from coastal populations in Brittany, Normandy, and Provence, lacked experience in complex naval battles requiring rigorous coordination in a line of battle. In 1716, the Marshal de Villars, visiting Toulon, lamented the neglected state of the former floating citadels, which “once carried the glory of the king, that of the nation, and the terror of our arms to the ends of the Earth”. The ministry worked to keep workers employed by assigning them to demolish old ships and build for trade.

=== Renewal of naval elites and espionage ===
Maurepas focused on training a new generation of engineers and officers to revitalize the Navy, drawing inspiration from the scientific and administrative advances of the Enlightenment. He recruited Duhamel du Monceau, whose work on material strength, timber preservation, and standardized carpentry revolutionized shipbuilding. His treatises, such as Éléments de l'architecture navale (1752), became references for shipyards and led to significant improvements in hull and mast quality. Meanwhile, espionage missions by Geslain and Ollivier in England and the United Provinces provided valuable insights into ship carpentry techniques, hull shapes optimized for speed and stability, armament methods, and British crew recruitment practices. These reports, often accompanied by sketches and detailed notes, enhanced French ship design, improving robustness, maneuverability, and durability, though production remained limited by financial constraints. In 1741, the Petite École de Construction was established in Paris, training shipbuilders in applied mathematics, physics, fluid mechanics, and technical drawing. This institution, though modest in size, reflected Maurepas’s commitment to a scientific and professional approach to shipbuilding, moving away from past empirical practices. It trained an elite of engineers capable of designing ships suited to modern warfare, where technology and precision played an increasing role. Simultaneously, Maurepas reformed officer training by strengthening naval schools, where midshipmen studied navigation, geodesy, astronomy, and foreign languages, essential for diplomatic and scientific missions.

=== New ships ===
The French Navy introduced the 74-gun ship, exemplified by the Tonnant (1744). These ships featured powerful artillery (24- and 36-pound cannons), optimized hulls for stability, and good maneuverability. Their design was highly regarded by the British, who after capturing the Invincible in 1747, adopted similar features in their own shipyards. The capture of the Invincible by the British in 1747 during the Battle of Cape Ortegal highlighted the superiority of French 74-gun ships, which combined devastating firepower with effective maneuverability in line battles. Their design, influenced by observations of English and Dutch shipyards, became a model of efficiency. The Royal Navy, impressed by the Invincible’s performance, adopted the 74-gun ship as a standard in its own shipyards from the 1750s, incorporating French innovations. This recognition marked a significant achievement for French engineers, though serial production remained limited by budgetary constraints and slow arsenals.

=== New frigates and arsenals ===
Frigates, essential for reconnaissance, escort, commerce raiding, and convoy protection, evolved under Maurepas’s direction. Traditional models, often under-armed and vulnerable, gave way to modern frigates of 8 and 12 pounds, which were faster, better equipped, and capable of engaging mid-sized adversaries, such as enemy sloops or small corvettes. Their numbers increased from 15 units in 1733 to 25 in 1744, enhancing the Navy’s flexibility in various theatres, from European coasts to the Caribbean. These frigates played a crucial role in commerce raiding, capturing British merchant ships and disrupting enemy trade routes. Meanwhile, arsenals were modernized to support the growing fleet, though efforts were constrained by limited resources. At Rochefort, covered sheds were constructed to protect ships under construction from the elements, extending material lifespans. At Lorient, a wood-steaming facility improved carpentry treatment by reducing moisture, making timber more resistant to fungi and insects. At Brest, new construction slipways and modern forges enhanced production capacity, enabling faster ship launches. These improvements laid the foundation for infrastructure capable of supporting a more ambitious fleet, though French arsenals lagged behind their British counterparts, such as Chatham or Portsmouth, in scale and efficiency.

=== Enlightenment ===
Under Maurepas’s leadership, the Royal Navy embraced the Enlightenment, adopting a scientific, universalist, and strategic vision for its missions. It supported major scientific expeditions, such as that of Charles Marie de La Condamine to Peru (1735-1744), which aimed to measure the Earth’s shape to resolve the debate between Newton’s and Cassini’s geodetic theories, a significant scientific issue of the time. This mission, funded by the crown and supported by the French Academy of Sciences, enhanced France’s prestige and trained versatile officers capable of navigating hostile environments, conducting complex observations (astronomical, geographical, botanical), and producing scientific reports for publication. Other expeditions to the southern seas or African coasts mapped unknown regions and identified potential trade routes. In 1752, the Académie de marine, established in Brest, became a major intellectual hub, uniting scholarly officers, engineers, and scientists who advanced knowledge in navigation, cartography, hydrography, meteorology, botany, and applied mathematics. These members, described as “as much, if not more, scholars than sailors” (Jean Meyer, Martine Acerra), published memoirs on topics ranging from shipbuilding to astronomical navigation and engaged with European counterparts through learned societies in London and Paris. This openness to maritime sciences marked a cultural shift for the Navy, expanding beyond a strictly military role to become a key player in scientific exploration, diplomacy, and the projection of French soft power globally.

=== War of the Austrian Succession ===
The War of the Austrian Succession tested the French Navy against a better-funded, more numerous, and better-organized Royal Navy. Despite limited resources and inadequate training, the fleet held its own in several strategic engagements. The Battle of Toulon (1744), though tactically inconclusive, demonstrated the combativeness of French crews, who repelled a combined Anglo-Spanish attack in the Mediterranean. This battle, led by Admiral Claude-Élisée de Court de La Bruyère, showed that the Royal Navy could compete under adverse conditions, though it faced coordination issues among its ships. Convoys to the colonies, particularly in the West Indies, where France exported sugar and coffee, were protected with some success, thanks to the efforts of frigates and privateers. The latter, operating from ports like Dunkirk, Saint-Malo, or Bayonne, harassed British merchant ships, capturing valuable prizes that enriched shipowners and fueled the war economy. However, the Navy’s lack of deep-sea training and coordination among its squadrons, often scattered between the Atlantic and Mediterranean, revealed the limitations of Louis XV’s peace policy, which prioritized short-term savings over long-term military preparedness. The Treaty of Aix-la-Chapelle (1748) ended the conflict without significant territorial or strategic gains for France, despite its efforts. The return of Louisbourg, a key fortress in Nova Scotia captured by the British, was poorly received in France, where public opinion began to view the Navy as an underutilized asset. This war highlighted the vulnerability of French colonies, poorly defended against British ambitions, and underscored the need for a more robust, better-trained, and better-funded fleet for future confrontations. It also marked the beginning of an awareness among French elites of the sea’s strategic importance, though this realization remained limited to a few reformers.

=== Seven Years' War ===
The Seven Years' War marked a low point for the Royal Navy in the 18th century. Ill-prepared, underfunded, and hampered by internal rivalries among officers and administrators, it suffered crushing defeats against a more aggressive and better-equipped Royal Navy, led by admirals like Edward Hawke and George Anson. The Battle of Lagos (1759), off Portugal, saw Admiral Jean-François de La Clue-Sabran lose several ships to a superior British squadron, compromising French plans in the Mediterranean. The Battle of Quiberon Bay (1759), in Brittany’s Quiberon Bay, under Marshal de Conflans, proved even more disastrous: a storm combined with a British attack destroyed or captured around ten ships, thwarting ambitious plans to invade Great Britain, such as the 1759 invasion plan that envisioned a landing in Scotland with Spanish support. Without a fleet capable of protecting troop transports, France abandoned this strategy and focused on defending its colonies, with little success. Canada fell to British forces under James Wolfe with the capture of Quebec (1759), despite the resistance of French troops led by Louis-Joseph de Montcalm. In India, French possessions like Pondicherry were lost after battles against the British East India Company’s forces. The Treaty of Paris (1763) confirmed British naval supremacy and marked the end of the first French colonial empire, reducing France to a few island territories like Martinique, Guadeloupe, and Saint-Domingue. The Royal Navy, exhausted, had only a handful of operational ships by the war’s end, with arsenals in poor condition, halted shipyards, and accumulated debts. This debacle, deeply humiliating for France, highlighted the urgent need for structural reform and provided the impetus for ambitious reforms under Louis XVI. It also shifted the perception of the Navy among French elites, who began to recognize the need to invest in a fleet capable of protecting colonial interests and competing with Great Britain at sea.

== Louis XVI (1774-1789) ==
=== Reorganization and modernization ===
The accession of Louis XVI in 1774 marked a significant revival for the Royal Navy, driven by the king’s personal interest in maritime affairs. Unlike Louis XV, who viewed the Navy as a secondary expense compared to continental priorities, Louis XVI actively engaged in naval projects. He consulted engineers, reviewed technical reports, visited the arsenals of Brest, Toulon, and Rochefort, and took an interest in shipbuilding and maritime strategy. This royal involvement provided unprecedented momentum for the fleet’s reconstruction, supported by a clear political will to restore France’s maritime prestige. Louis XVI appointed Antoine de Sartine as Minister of the Navy (1774-1780), an energetic administrator who launched a comprehensive reform program to rebuild the fleet after the Seven Years’ War. Sartine increased the naval budget from 30 million livres in 1774 to 150 million in 1780, enabling the construction of dozens of new ships, the renovation of existing ones, and the modernization of port infrastructure. He also reformed crew organization, strengthening onboard discipline, improving sailors’ living conditions—through more abundant food rations, medical care against scurvy, and standardized uniforms—and reducing desertions, which had plagued the Navy under Louis XV. Sartine established a stricter training system for officers, with regular exams and mandatory sea internships, to professionalize the naval corps. In 1780, Castries succeeded Sartine and continued his reforms with a strategic focus on long-term power projection and preparation for conflict with Great Britain. Castries oversaw the development of port-arsenals, notably Cherbourg, where a breakwater, begun under Louis XV and completed in 1784, represented a maritime engineering feat. This breakwater, stretching several kilometers, protected a strategic anchorage facing England, allowing France to station a fleet near British coasts and threaten enemy trade routes. Castries also modernized the infrastructure of Brest, Toulon, and Rochefort, which became industrial hubs capable of serial ship production due to streamlined shipyards and better-managed material stocks. He collaborated with engineers like Borda and Sané, who optimized ship designs. Borda, a scientist and officer, developed calculation methods to improve ship stability and naval artillery accuracy, while Sané, a renowned naval architect, perfected the 74-gun ship. This ship, the cornerstone of the French fleet, combined powerful firepower (74 cannons of 36, 24, and 12 pounds), respectable speed, and moderate cost due to a standardized design that facilitated production and maintenance. By 1786, the Royal Navy boasted 80 ships of the line, 80 frigates, and 120 light vessels, rivaling the Royal Navy in quality, if not quantity. These efforts repositioned France as a leading maritime power, ready to challenge Great Britain for global supremacy.

=== American War ===
The American War provided the Royal Navy an opportunity to counter the Royal Navy after the humiliations of the Seven Years’ War. Supporting American insurgents in their fight for independence against the British crown, France deployed its fleet in bold operations across the Atlantic, Caribbean, and Indian Ocean. The Battle of the Chesapeake (1781), won by Admiral de Grasse, marked the campaign’s climax. In September 1781, de Grasse blocked Chesapeake Bay, Virginia, preventing the British fleet under Thomas Graves from resupplying General Cornwallis’s army at Yorktown. This naval victory, combined with the Franco-American land offensive led by George Washington and the Comte de Rochambeau, precipitated the British surrender at Yorktown, a decisive turning point in the American War of Independence. Other successes strengthened the Royal Navy’s reputation. The capture of Tobago (1781) and Saint Kitts (1782) in the Caribbean, under officers like the Marquis de Bouillé, demonstrated France’s ability to conduct amphibious operations far from its European bases. In the Indian Ocean, Admiral Suffren, known as the “Bailli de Suffren,” waged a remarkable campaign against British forces, securing tactical victories, such as the Battle of Sadras (1782), and protecting French interests in India. These operations, conducted with limited resources and far from the metropole, highlighted the resilience and skill of French officers. The Treaty of Versailles (1783) affirmed France’s decisive role in the American victory and restored its naval credibility internationally. France recovered territories, such as Tobago and trading posts in India, and gained increased diplomatic influence, though the war’s financial cost—nearly 1.3 billion livres—exacerbated the budgetary crisis that contributed to the French Revolution. This war marked a moment of glory for the Royal Navy, proving its ability to rival the Royal Navy in multiple theatres, but also exposed France’s inability to sustain such efforts long-term.

=== Maritimized economy ===
The French economy transformed significantly in the 18th century, driven by the increasing maritimization of trade, which became a key engine of national prosperity. The West Indies, with their substantial exports of sugar, coffee, indigo, and cotton, generated significant revenues, accounting for up to 40% of French foreign trade by the century’s end. Ports like Nantes, Bordeaux, Marseille, and La Rochelle became dynamic economic hubs, linking the metropole to colonies and European markets. The French East India Company, despite financial difficulties and temporary dissolution in 1769, extended French influence in Asia, with trading posts in Pondicherry, Chandernagore, and Mahé. This economic dynamism financed naval efforts, enabling new ship construction and arsenal maintenance, but also exposed France to heightened rivalry with Great Britain, whose merchant and military navy dominated global trade routes from the Caribbean to Asia. Naval officers, primarily from the nobility but sometimes from the maritime bourgeoisie, became versatile figures, embodying the Enlightenment ideal. Trained in navigation, gunnery, naval tactics, and crew management, they also excelled as diplomats, explorers, geographers, botanists, astronomers, or ethnographers. Notable figures illustrated this versatility. Louis Antoine de Bougainville, who circumnavigated the globe (1766-1769), described Tahiti in his account Voyage autour du monde, captivating European audiences with depictions of a “paradisiacal” society. Lapérouse, exploring the Pacific (1785-1788), sent detailed scientific reports on the coasts of Alaska, Japan, and Australia before his disappearance. Others, like Yves-Joseph de Kerguelen-Trémarec, explored southern seas, discovering islands like the Kerguelen, though their expeditions sometimes faced logistical challenges. These expeditions, often supported by the French Academy of Sciences and funded by the crown, enhanced France’s prestige and enriched knowledge in geography, botany, zoology, anthropology, and hydrography. They also enabled the Navy to map strategic regions, like the Pacific, where rivalries with the British and Spanish intensified by the century’s end. Officers, trained in modernized naval schools, mastered scientific tools like the sextant, marine chronometer, and astronomical tables, revolutionizing deep-sea navigation. Their role extended beyond the military, positioning them as France’s ambassadors in distant lands, where they negotiated with local leaders, established trade contacts, or collected specimens for royal botanical gardens. Lapérouse, selected to lead an ambitious scientific expedition, embarked with instruments used by Cook, loaned by the United Kingdom. He discovered the strait bearing his name between Sakhalin and Hokkaido on 2 August 1787. His expedition vanished in June 1788 on the reefs of Vanikoro, a tragedy that remained unresolved until 1826, when Peter Dillon recovered relics. An anecdote reports that Louis XVI, on the day of his execution, inquired about Lapérouse’s fate.

=== Conclusion ===
By 1789, the Royal Navy reached its peak under Louis XVI, with 80 ships of the line, 80 frigates, 120 light vessels, and 80,000 sailors, making it the world’s second-largest fleet, behind the Royal Navy. The reforms of Sartine and Castries, combined with the king’s strategic vision and the technical innovations of Borda and Sané, enabled France to rival Great Britain, as demonstrated by the success of the American War. The standardized 74-gun ship, modernized arsenals, versatile officers, and scientific tradition developed by the Académie de marine constituted a significant legacy, positioning France at the height of its maritime ambition. However, this revival was fragile. The French Revolution disrupted the fleet, with noble officers emigrating to England, Austria, or Russia, taking their expertise. Arsenals, deprived of funds and direction, fell into disrepair, with halted shipyards and looted stocks. Sailors, influenced by revolutionary ideas, divided or mutinied, as seen in the Brest revolts of 1790. Defeats, such as Trafalgar (1805) under Napoleon, where the Franco-Spanish fleet was defeated by Nelson, marked the collapse of French maritime ambitions, relegating the Navy to a secondary role for decades. Despite these setbacks, the Royal Navy’s legacy from 1715 to 1789 remained significant. Technical innovations, like the 74-gun ship, influenced European navies until the steam era. Port-arsenals, such as Brest and Cherbourg, remained strategic bases for modern France. The tradition of scientific exploration, embodied by Bougainville, Lapérouse, and their successors, inspired future generations, laying the foundation for a French navy that, despite challenges, retained global ambition. This period demonstrated France’s ability to reinvent itself as a maritime power, despite economic, geographical, and cultural constraints, but also highlighted the limitations of a monarchical system unable to fully mobilize resources to rival British supremacy. As Jean-Christian Petitfils noted, the sea preserved the secret of the grand expedition desired by the “immobile navigator” of Versailles.

== See also ==
- History of the French Navy
- French Navy
- American Revolutionary War
- War of the Austrian Succession
- Seven Years' War
- 74-gun ship
- Louis Antoine de Bougainville
- Jean-François de Galaup, comte de Lapérouse
- Pierre André de Suffren
- Treaty of Versailles (1783)
- Treaty of Paris (1763)

== Bibliography ==
- Acerra, Martine; Zysberg, André (1997). L'essor des marines de guerre européennes : 1680-1790 [The Rise of European War Navies: 1680-1790] (in French). Rennes: Ouest-France. ISBN 978-2-7373-1660-9.
- ]Acerra, Martine; Meyer, Jean (1987). La Grande Époque de la marine à voiles [The Great Era of the Sailing Navy] (in French). Paris: Ouest-France. ISBN 978-2-7373-0050-9.
- Meyer, Jean; Acerra, Martine (1994). Histoire de la marine française [History of the French Navy] (in French). Rennes: Ouest-France. ISBN 978-2-7373-1129-1.
- Villiers, Patrick; Duteil, Jean-Pierre; Muchembled, Robert (1997). L'Europe, la mer et les colonies : XVIIe-XVIIIe siècle [Europe, the Sea, and the Colonies: 17th-18th Century] (in French). Paris: Hachette. ISBN 978-2-01-145136-1.
- Vergé-Franceschi, Michel (2002). Dictionnaire d'histoire maritime [Dictionary of Maritime History]. Bouquins (in French). Paris: Robert Laffont.
- Zysberg, André (2002). La Monarchie des Lumières, 1715-1786 [The Monarchy of the Enlightenment, 1715-1786] (in French). Paris: Points. ISBN 978-2-02-019886-8.
- Petitfils, Jean-Christian (2005). Louis XVI [Louis XVI] (in French). Paris: Perrin. ISBN 978-2-262-01484-1.
- Taillemite, Étienne (2003). Histoire ignorée de la marine française [Unknown History of the French Navy] (in French). Paris: Perrin. ISBN 978-2-262-01944-0.
- Chaline, Olivier (2016). La mer et la France [The Sea and France] (in French). Paris: Flammarion. ISBN 978-2-08-133327-7.
- Villiers, Patrick (2021). Des vaisseaux et des hommes [Of Ships and Men] (in French). Paris: Fayard. ISBN 978-2-213-68127-6.
- Monaque, Rèmi (2009). Suffren : un destin inachevé [Suffren: An Unfinished Destiny] (in French). Paris: Tallandier. ISBN 978-2-84734-611-4.
- Le Moing, Guy (2011). Les 600 plus grandes batailles navales de l'histoire [The 600 Greatest Naval Battles in History] (in French). Rennes: Marines Éditions. ISBN 978-2-35743-077-8.
