= French ship Redoutable (1752) =

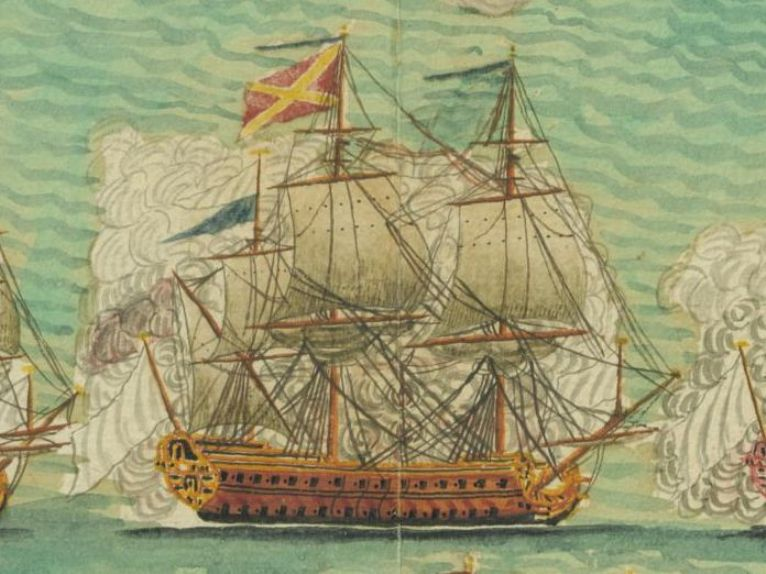
Redoubtable at the 1756 Battle of Minorca.

Redoutable was a French Navy 74 gun ship of the line, launched in 1749 and lost in the Battle of Lagos in 1759. She had a crew of 740. (Note: The usual ratio on all 18th-century ships of the line was at least ten men per gun, regardless of that man's role on board, meaning that a 100-gun ship had a crew of 1000, an 80-gun ship 800 men, a 74-gun ship 740 men, a 64-gun ship 640 men and so on. This did not include the captain and his staff and was only a standard strength, which could vary considerably in the event of an epidemic, casualties, or a shortage of sailors on readying for sea.)

Its career was limited to the first four years of the Seven Years' War. The Redoutable was one of thirty-seven ships of the line lost by France during the Seven Years War - eighteen captured by the enemy, nineteen burned or wrecked.

== Description ==
She was launched according to the norms defined by French shipbuilders in the 1740s to achieve a good balance of cost, manoeuvrability and armament and to keep up with the Royal Navy, which had had more ships of the line since the end of Louis XIV's wars. The ship was laid down in April 1749 (at the start of the spike in ship construction between the end of the War of the Austrian Succession that year and the start of the Seven Years War in 1754) and launched on 24 October the same year.

As with all ships of the line in that era, she had an oak hull. Her masts and yards were made of pine and elm, linden, poplar and walnut for the gun carriages, the forecastle carvings and the interior woodwork. Hemp was used to create her 80 tonnes of rope and almost 2,500 square metres of sails. A second spare set of sails was planned to be kept in the hold.

On her lower deck were twenty-eight 36-pounder long guns (the largest calibre in service in the French fleet at that time), on her upper deck thirty 18-pounder long guns, and on her castles sixteen 8-pounder long guns - together they totalled 215 tonnes and the ship embarked almost 6,000 cannonballs weighing 67 tonnes in total (Note: Specifically, 2,240 36-pound shot, 2,400 18-pound shot and 1,200 8-pound shot.) and 8 tonnes of grapeshot, chainshot and barshot. It also embarked 20 tonnes of gunpowder, stored as cartridges or loose powder in the ship's bilge. A quarter of that powder was loaded in advance to meet the needs of the lower battery of 36-pounders and a third for the other deck and the castles.

== Engagements ==
In 1756, under the command of Pierre-André de Glandevès du Castellet, she formed part of La Galissonière's squadron of twelve ships of the line, sailing from Toulon and commanded to protect the French landing on Minorca. On 20 May she played a part in the French victory at the Battle of Minorca.

In 1759 she joined La Clue's squadron, sailing from Toulon with orders to join up with the Brest squadron and cover the attempted landing in England. It was destroyed off the coast at the end of the Battle of Lagos - its crew burned the ship on the beach beside the flagship Océan rather than let them be captured by the Royal Navy.

== Bibliography (in French) ==
- Acerra, Martine; Zysberg, André (1997). L'essor des marines de guerre européennes : vers 1680-1790. « Regards sur l'histoire » (no 119). Paris: SEDES. ISBN 2-7181-9515-0.
- Lacour-Gayet, Georges (1902). La Marine militaire de la France sous le règne de Louis XV (in French). Honoré Champion éditeur.
- Meyer, Jean; Acerra, Martine (1994). Histoire de la marine française : des origines à nos jours. Rennes: Ouest-France. ISBN 2-7373-1129-2.
- Vergé-Franceschi, Michel (2002). Dictionnaire d'Histoire maritime. Bouquins (in French). éditions Robert Laffont.
- Villiers, Patrick (2015). La France sur mer: De Louis XIII à Napoléon 1st. Pluriel (in French). Paris: Fayard. ISBN 978-2-8185-0437-6.
