= French ship Téméraire (1749) =

Ship of the line of the French Navy

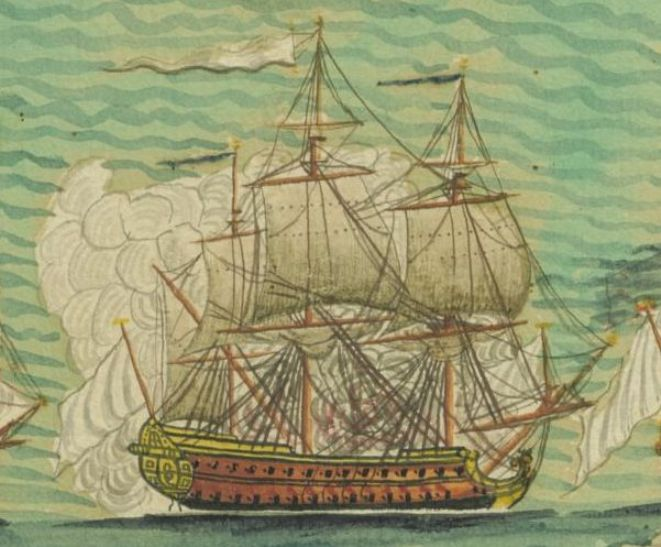

History

France
- Name: Téméraire
- Ordered: 18 December 1747
- Builder: Pierre-Blaise Coulomb, Toulon Dockyard
- Laid down: August 1748
- Launched: 24 December 1749
- Commissioned: 1750
- Captured: 18 August 1759, by Royal Navy

Great Britain
- Name: Temeraire
- Acquired: 18 August 1759
- Fate: Sold, June 1784

General characteristics
- Class & type: 74-gun third rate ship of the line
- Displacement: 2800 tonneaux
- Tons burthen: 1580 port tonneaux
- Length: 161¾ French feet (Note: The French (pre-metric) foot was 6.575% longer than the contemporary British unit of measurement of that name.)
- Beam: 43½ French feet
- Draught: 19 French feet
- Depth of hold: 21 French feet
- Propulsion: Sails
- Sail plan: Full-rigged ship
- Complement: 680, + 6/13 officers
- Armament: 74 guns of various weights of shot

Téméraire was a 74-gun ship of the line of the French Navy, ordered in December 1747 to a design by François Coulomb, and built at Toulon by his cousin, the constructor Pierre-Blaise Coulomb; she was launched on 24 December 1749. Her 74 guns comprised:
28 × 36-pounders on the lower deck
30 × 18-pounders on the upper deck
10 × 8-pounders on the quarterdeck
6 × 8-pounders on the forecastle.

HMS Warspite under Admiral Boscawen captured Téméraire at the Battle of Lagos on 18 August 1759. She was thus taken into the Royal Navy and recommissioned as the Third Rate HMS Temeraire.

By 1780 she was used as a floating battery used to protect the harbour at Plymouth. She was sold in 1783.

== Fate ==
Temeraire was sold out of the navy in 1784.

== See also ==
- List of ships captured in the 18th century
