= HMS Leopard (1703) =

Ship of the line of the Royal Navy

History

Great Britain
- Name: HMS Leopard
- Builder: Swallow, Rotherhithe
- Launched: 15 March 1703
- Fate: Broken up, 1739

General characteristics as built
- Class & type: 50-gun fourth rate ship of the line
- Tons burthen: 683
- Length: 131 ft 1 in (40.0 m) (gundeck)
- Beam: 34 ft 4 1/2 in (10.5 m)
- Depth of hold: 13 ft 6 in (4.1 m)
- Propulsion: Sails
- Sail plan: Full-rigged ship
- Armament: 50 guns of various weights of shot

General characteristics after 1721 rebuild
- Class & type: 1719 Establishment 50-gun fourth rate ship of the line
- Tons burthen: 762
- Length: 134 ft (40.8 m) (gundeck)
- Beam: 36 ft (11.0 m)
- Depth of hold: 15 ft 2 in (4.6 m)
- Propulsion: Sails
- Sail plan: Full-rigged ship
- Armament: 50 guns: Gundeck: 22 × 18-pdrs; Upper gundeck: 22 × 9-pdrs; Quarterdeck: 4 × 6-pdrs; Forecastle: 2 × 6-pdrs

HMS Leopard was a 50-gun fourth rate ship of the line of the Royal Navy, built at Rotherhithe and launched on 15 March 1703.

Leopard underwent a rebuild according to the 1719 Establishment at Woolwich, and was relaunched on 18 April 1721. Leopard served until 1739, when she was broken up.
