= French ship Océan (1756) =

Ship of the line of the French Navy

History

Kingdom of France
- Name: Océan
- Namesake: Ocean
- Ordered: 1751
- Builder: Toulon Dockyard
- Laid down: 29 May 1753
- Launched: 20 June 1756
- Completed: November 1756
- Fate: Burnt on 19 August 1759

General characteristics
- Displacement: 3300 tonneaux
- Tons burthen: 1900 port tonneaux
- Length: 56.85 m (186.5 ft)
- Beam: 15.59 m (51.1 ft)
- Draught: 7.47 m (24.5 ft)
- Propulsion: Sails
- Complement: 800 men, 14 officers
- Armament: 80 gun: 30 36-pounder long guns; 32 18-pounder long guns; 18 8-pounder long guns

Océan was an 80-gun ship in the French Navy, the first ship to bear that name. She was designed by Antoine Groignard and constructed at Toulon by Joseph Véronique-Charles Chapelle. Her name Océan, subsequently reserved for the largest units of the French Navy, is evidence of the change of focus from large three-deckers into strong two-deckers.

She was Comte de la Clue's flagship at the battle of Lagos, where she ran aground in Almadora Bay and was burnt by the British.
