= HMS Newark (1695) =

Ship of the line of the Royal Navy

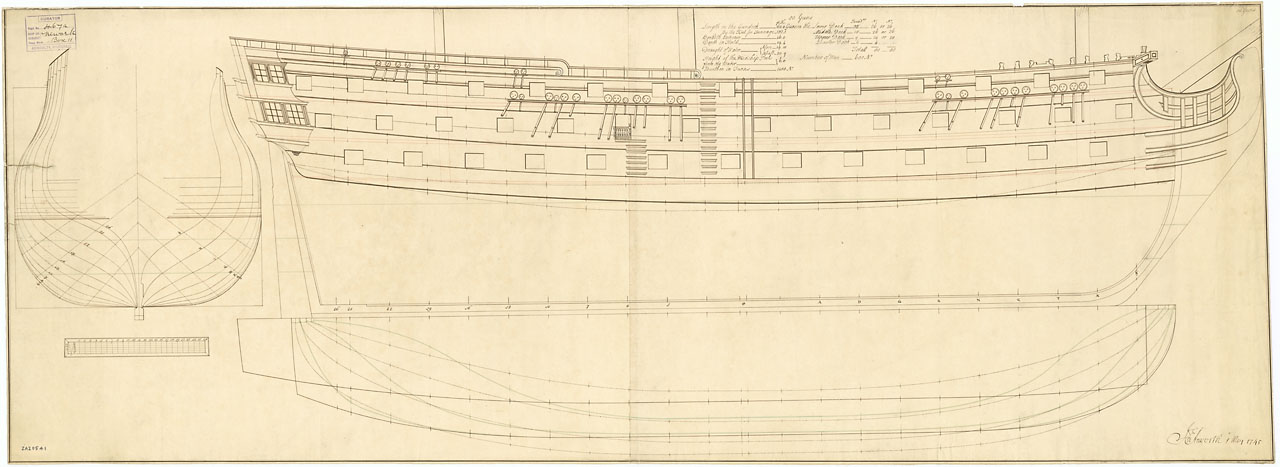
- Plan of the 80 gun version of the Newark

History

Great Britain
- Name: HMS Newark
- Builder: Frame, Hull
- Launched: 3 June 1695
- Fate: Broken up, 1787

General characteristics as built
- Class & type: 80-gun third rate ship of the line
- Tons burthen: 1216 bm
- Length: 157 ft 1.5 in (47.9 m) (gundeck)
- Beam: 41 ft 10.5 in (12.8 m)
- Depth of hold: 18 ft (5.5 m)
- Propulsion: Sails
- Sail plan: Full-rigged ship
- Armament: 80 guns of various weights of shot

General characteristics after 1717 rebuild
- Class & type: 1706 Establishment 80-gun third rate ship of the line
- Tons burthen: 1283 bm
- Length: 156 ft (47.5 m) (gundeck)
- Beam: 43 ft 6 in (13.3 m)
- Depth of hold: 17 ft 8 in (5.4 m)
- Propulsion: Sails
- Sail plan: Full-rigged ship
- Armament: 80 guns: Gundeck: 26 × 32 pdrs; Middle gundeck: 26 × 12 pdrs; Upper gundeck: 24 × 6 pdrs; Quarterdeck: 4 × 6 pdrs

General characteristics after 1747 rebuild
- Class & type: 1741 proposals 80-gun third rate ship of the line
- Tons burthen: 1521 bm
- Length: 161 ft (49.1 m) (gundeck)
- Beam: 46 ft (14.0 m)
- Depth of hold: 19 ft 4 in (5.9 m)
- Propulsion: Sails
- Sail plan: Full-rigged ship
- Armament: 80 guns: Gundeck: 26 × 32 pdrs; Middle gundeck: 26 × 18 pdrs; Upper gundeck: 24 × 9 pdrs; Quarterdeck: 4 × 6 pdrs

HMS Newark was an 80-gun third rate ship of the line of the Royal Navy, launched at Hull on 3 June 1695.

She was rebuilt according to the 1706 Establishment at Chatham Dockyard, and relaunched on 29 July 1717. During this rebuild an extra gundeck was added to make her a three-decker, instead of the two-decker as which she had been originally built. She continued to be classified as a third rate, however.

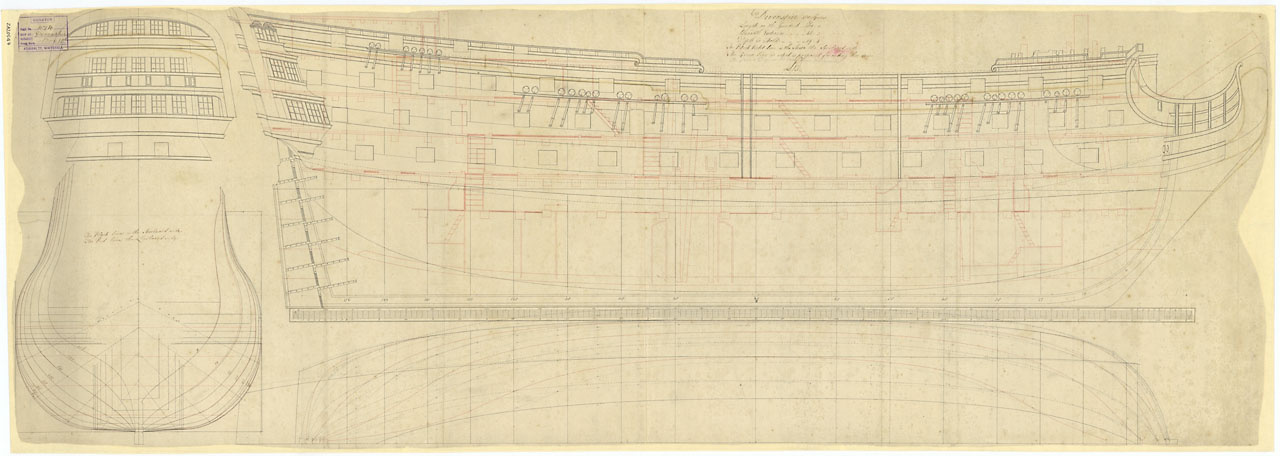
Newarks proposal plan to cut down and reduce the ship to a 66-gun two-decker at Portsmouth Dockyard. (1746–1747).

On 24 April 1741 she was ordered to be taken to pieces and rebuilt at Chatham according to the 1741 proposals of the 1719 Establishment. She was relaunched on 27 August 1747, as a 66-gun Third Rate, two-decker. Newark jammed halfway down the stocks during the launch and was left there for several days, after which she unjammed herself and completed the launching.

Newark continued to serve until 1787, when she was broken up.
