= Jean-François de La Clue-Sabran =

French naval officer

Jean-François de Sabran, comte de La Clue (known as "La Clue-Sabran"; 30 September 1696 – 4 October 1764) was a French naval officer best known for his command of the French fleet in the Mediterranean Sea during the Seven Years' War.

== Seven Years War ==
He was appointed chef d'escadre (the lowest level of general officer in the French Navy) on 25 September 1755. After attempting to sail to the relief of Louisbourg in 1758, he was trapped in the neutral Spanish harbour of Cartagena. Following the Battle of Cartagena, La Clue returned to Toulon, abandoning his attempt to relieve Louisbourg.

In 1759, as part of a French plan to invade the British Isles, La Clue sailed from Toulon hoping to escape through the Strait of Gibraltar and join with the other main French fleet at Brest. He was caught by a patrolling British fleet under Edward Boscawen and defeated at the Battle of Lagos off Portugal. The battle, along with the Battle of Quiberon Bay later in the year, ended any immediate chance of a successful French invasion.

Following the conclusion of the war, La Clue-Sabran retired from the Navy in 1764 with the rank of lieutenant-général des armées navales. He died later the same year.

== Bibliography ==
- McLynn, Frank. 1759: The Year Britain Became Master of the World. Pimlico, 2005.
- Rodger, N. A. M.. Command of the Ocean: A Naval History of Britain, 1649–1815. Penguin Books, 2006.
