= HMS Chesterfield (1745) =

Fifth-rate ship of the Royal Navy

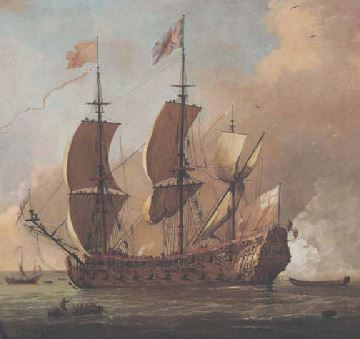
- A fifth-rate of the Royal Navy, built on the same design principles as Chesterfield; By Adriaen van Diest (1655–1703)

History

Great Britain
- Name: HMS Chesterfield
- Namesake: Chesterfield, Derbyshire
- Ordered: 23 May 1744
- Builder: John Quallett, Rotherhithe
- Laid down: 2 June 1744
- Launched: 31 October 1745
- Completed: 25 January 1746 at Deptford Dockyard
- Commissioned: November 1745
- In service: 1745–1749; 1755–1762
- Honours and awards: Battle of Minorca (1756)
- Fate: Wrecked off Cuba, July 1762

General characteristics
- Class & type: 44-gun fifth-rate ship
- Tons burthen: 719 38/94 bm
- Length: 127 ft 5 in (38.8 m) (gundeck); 102 ft 8.25 in (31.3 m) (keel)
- Beam: 36 ft 3.5 in (11.1 m)
- Depth of hold: 15 ft 5 in (4.70 m)
- Sail plan: Full-rigged ship
- Complement: 280 officers and crew
- Armament: 44 guns comprising: Upper deck: 20 × 9-pounder guns; Gundeck: 20 × 18-pounder guns; Quarterdeck: 4 × 6-pounder guns

HMS Chesterfield was a 44-gun fifth-rate ship of the Royal Navy which saw active service in both the War of the Austrian Succession and the Seven Years' War. Built to an antiquated design, she was commissioned into service in 1745 and assigned to the Navy's Western Squadron guarding the English Channel and the nearby waters to protect merchant vessels en route to English ports. In 1747 she secured her first victory at sea with the capture of a 10-gun Spanish privateer.

In the following year Chesterfield sailed to West Africa to make an annual survey of British forts. A mutiny during this voyage led to the stranding of her captain on shore and an attempt by the first lieutenant to take the ship to the West Indies to steal supplies. Retaken by loyalists among the crew, Chesterfield was surrendered to British authorities in Antigua in December 1748. A subsequent court martial led to the execution of two officers and five others on board.

Chesterfield was decommissioned in 1748 but restored to active service in 1755 as Britain rearmed for the Seven Years' War with France. Present but not directly engaged in the Battle of Minorca in 1756, she was instrumental in transporting British wounded to Gibraltar for care. Later service included voyages between England and North America to protect British convoy vessels, as well as patrols of American coastal waters. In 1758 she captured two brigantines on the York River in Virginia, which were later found to be trading with the enemy. For the remainder of the Seven Years' War she was principally assigned to convoy escort duties between England and North America, other than one brief return to West Africa in 1760 during which she fought off an assault by pirates. After 16 years of service, she was wrecked off northern Cuba in July 1762 while escorting troop transports to assist in Britain's Siege of Havana.

== Construction ==
Chesterfield was an oak-built 44-gun fifth-rate, one of 16 vessels constructed according to the 1741 revisions to the 1719 Establishment which set specific requirements for scantlings, materials, fitting and armament for Royal Navy craft. Principles underpinning the 1719 Establishment were drawn from Admiralty observation and practice from the mid-seventeenth century, with minor modifications in the subsequent revisions. For Chesterfield the 1741 revisions allowed minor increases in length, beam and depth of hold, and the addition of four 6-pounder guns at the rear of the quarterdeck. These changes aside, Chesterfield was built to a design largely unchanged from that of fifth-rate Royal Navy ships from the previous century. Notably, no allowance was made for the use of longer, sleeker hulls such as were becoming common in equivalent French vessels by the 1740s.

Orders for Chesterfield were issued during the middle years of the War of Jenkins' Ear, when Britain's Royal Dockyards were fully engaged in building and fitting-out ships of the line. Consequently, and despite some Navy Board misgivings, contracts for small and mid-sized vessels were issued to private shipyards, with an emphasis on rapid completion. Chesterfield's contract was therefore signed on 23 May 1744 with private shipwright John Quallett of Rotherhithe in South London. Work was to be finished within one year for a 44-gun vessel measuring approximately 705 tons burthen, for a fee of £7,554 paid through periodic imprests drawn against the Navy Board. In practice neither the timeline nor the budget was met. Chesterfield's keel was laid down on 2 June 1744 but construction lasted seventeen months with the ship not ready for launch until 31 October 1745. The final cost was £7,931, with an additional £5,097 set aside for fitting out.

The vessel was named after Chesterfield, a market town in Derbyshire, England. This continued a Board of Admiralty tradition dating to 1644, of naming ships for geographic features. Overall nine of the 16 vessels in the 1741 Establishment were named after well-known regions, castles or towns. (Note: The exceptions to this naming convention were Hector, Roebuck, Lark, Pearl, Mary Galley, Prince Edward and Thetis.)

As built, Chesterfield was 127 ft 5 in (38.8 m) long with a 102 ft 8 in (31.3 m) keel, a beam of 36 ft 3.5 in (11.062 m), and a hold depth of 15 ft 5 in (4.7 m). At 719 38/94 tons burthen, she was the second largest vessel in the 1741 Establishment after HMS Ludlow Castle, and a full fourteen tons over the stipulated contract size. Her armament comprised 20 nine-pounder cannons on her upper deck, and 20 eighteen-pounder cannons on the enclosed lower deck close to the waterline. These broadside weapons were supported by four six-pounder guns at the rear of the quarterdeck behind the wheel. The Admiralty-designated complement was 280 comprising four commissioned officers – a captain and three lieutenants – overseeing 59 warrant and petty officers, 133 naval ratings, 45 Marines and 39 servants and other ranks. (Note: The 39 servants and other ranks provided for in the ship's complement consisted of 25 personal servants and clerical staff, six assistant carpenters, an assistant sailmaker, a steward's mate and six widow's men. Unlike naval ratings, servants and other ranks took no part in the sailing or handling of the ship.) Among these other ranks were six positions reserved for widow's men: fictitious crew members whose pay was retained by the captain to be reallocated to the families of sailors who died at sea.

== Strategic rationale ==
The concept of 40- and 44-gun fifth rate ships such as Chesterfield had been developed in the seventeenth century when the Royal Navy was principally deployed in short-range operations in the English Channel and adjacent waters. Chesterfield was one of the last to be constructed before Admiral Anson's 1751 reforms introduced a new class of 74-gun vessels as the minimum size for a ship of the line and promoted development of small fast frigates of around 32 guns to chase the enemy close to shore. Under these reforms a 44-gun fifth-rate such as Chesterfield became an anachronism: too small to be effective in the line of battle and too slow to pursue opposing frigates or privateers. Instead, the impetus for Chesterfield's construction was Admiralty's realisation that too few middle-sized vessels were available to protect merchant convoys and conduct routine patrols in the Channel, the Mediterranean and off the coast of Africa. Many existing fifth-rate vessels were also derelict: of the nineteen listed as being in service in 1739 only seven were seaworthy with another five salvageable after major repairs. The dearth of convoy escorts was so severe that in 1741 Admiral Thomas Mathews complained that he was using 70-gun ships of the line simply to guard Mediterranean trade. Vessels such as Chesterfield were urgently needed to alleviate this shortfall and allow larger vessels to resume other roles.

However her antiquated design left Chesterfield at a disadvantage even for escort and patrol. The 44-gun fifth-rates such as Chesterfield were top-heavy with a tendency to roll in bad weather. In addition the lower deck gunports were too close to the waterline and could not be opened in rough seas for fear of flooding the ship. In approving the designs, Admiralty argued that a slightly wider hull gave greater room for crews to work any accessible guns while the enclosed upper deck reduced exposure to enemy small arms fire in close combat. Despite these modifications, naval historian John Charnock suggests that the vessels of Chesterfield's group were built more from a sense of tradition than from coherent strategic thinking, and indeed were "the worst vessels which, at that time, composed any part of the British navy." Only one new 44-gun fifth rate was constructed between 1750 and 1770, though the concept was later revived to suit the specialised needs of coastal warfare in the American Revolutionary War.

== War of the Austrian Succession ==
=== English Channel ===
Chesterfield was launched at Rotherhithe on 31 October 1745 and sailed to Deptford Dockyard for fitting-out and to take on armament and crew. She was formally commissioned in November, entering Royal Navy service during the latter stages of the War of the Austrian Succession against France and Spain. Command was assigned to Captain William Gordon, previously of Chesterfield's sister ship HMS Looe. There were delays in mustering sufficient crew, and Chesterfield was not finally ready to put to sea until January 1746. She was then assigned to the Navy's Western Squadron under Admiral William Martin, tasked with protecting shipping in the English Channel and supporting a blockade of France's Atlantic ports. In this capacity she secured her first victory at sea by capturing the 10-gun Spanish privateer San Elmo in April 1747. The captured vessel was sailed to the Portuguese port of Madeira to be sold as a prize with the proceeds divided between the Admiralty and Chesterfield's crew.

=== West Africa ===
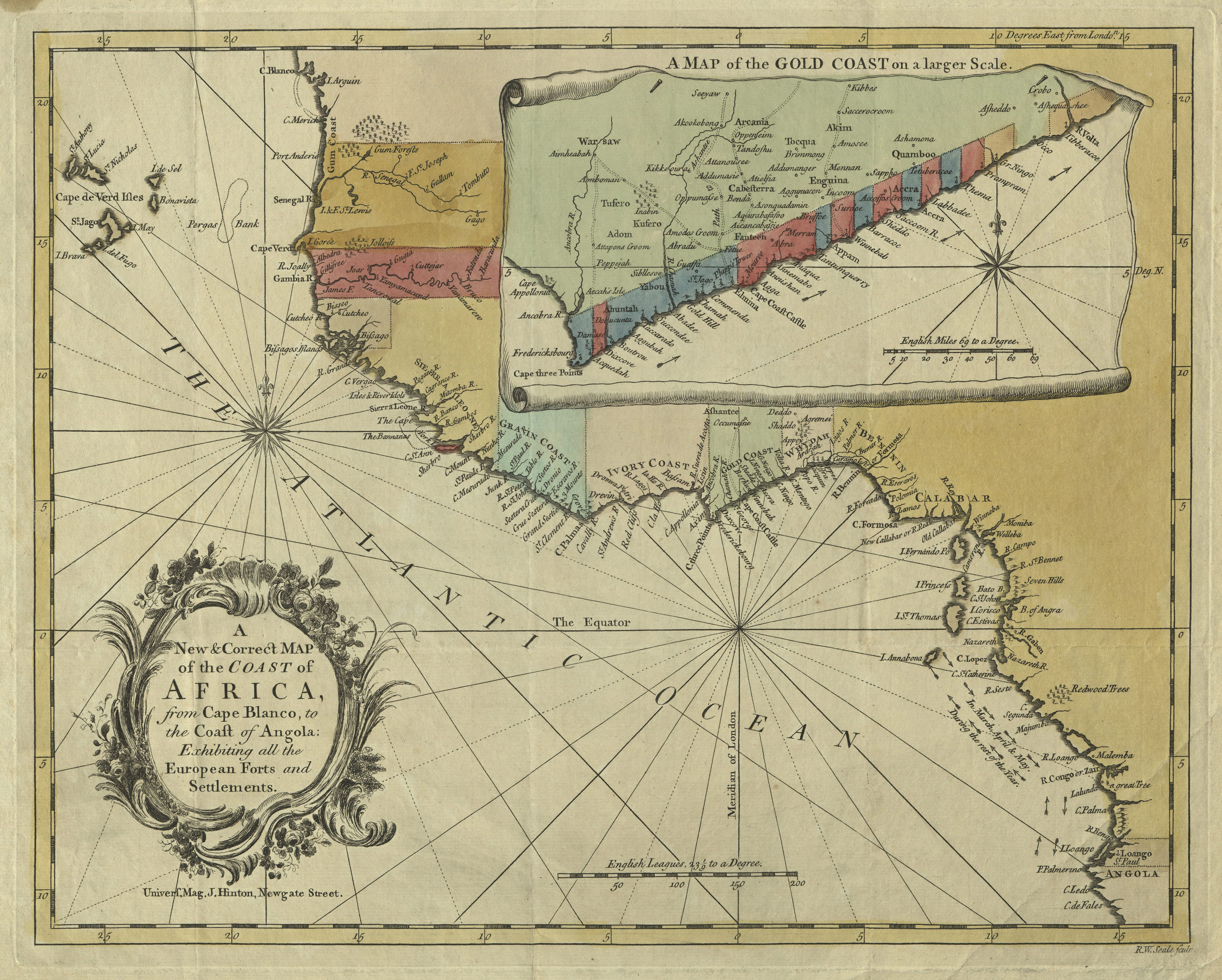
European forts and settlements in West Africa during Chesterfield's 1748 cruise from Gambia (top left) to Cape Coast Castle (centre and inset). By Richard William Seale (–1785)

In November 1747 command of Chesterfield passed to Captain O'Brien Dudley, with orders to patrol the coasts of West Africa to survey the state of British fortifications and slaving establishments. The orders followed an agreement between Admiralty which provided a vessel for annual patrol, and the Royal African Company which had responsibility for reviewing the survey and maintaining the forts. In general Britain's West African forts were poorly armed and maintained, with small garrisons and little capacity for defence. Historian Joshua Newton describes them as "feeble and frequently dilapidated ... little more than guarded warehouses" at risk from attack from European or African opponents. For this reason the British settlements viewed the annual presence of a Royal Navy vessel as a welcome reminder of national military strength. The annual patrol was also generally considered an agreeable assignment for the Royal Navy crew, as there was little risk of encountering a well-armed enemy ship and many opportunities for small-scale trade in gold and souvenirs. (Note: In the 1740s and 1750s the only European naval establishment in West Africa was at the French settlement of Goree in Senegal, which peridiocally hosted a single 74-gun warship and 2–3 smaller vessels. Royal Navy patrols such as that conducted by Chesterfield in 1748 avoided interaction with the French by sailing offshore until past the Senegalese coast then turning toward land at the Gambia and then proceeding south and west toward Ghana. The return journey was south and then west for the British West Indies.)

Chesterfield sailed for her African patrol in January 1748, stopping first at Spithead and then at Cork Harbour in Ireland, before heading south to Gibraltar and Madeira. In early May she fell in with the 50-gun HMS Colchester and the 44-gun Enterprise, both on Mediterranean service; together with these vessels she secured her second victory at sea with the capture of St Peter, a French polacca. The captured French craft was sent back to England as a prize with the proceeds of her sale divided among the English crews. Chesterfield then continued alone, reaching the Portuguese settlement of Porto Praya in Cape Verde in June 1748. Shore leave was unwisely granted to some of Chesterfield's men, leading to a street brawl with local inhabitants which left two crew members dead and several others wounded.

Leaving Cape Verde in late June 1748, Chesterfield turned to the African mainland to cruise the coast of Gambia and Sierra Leone before turning east along the Bight of Benin to Cape Coast Castle, the Royal African Company's headquarters in Ghana. As seaborne combat was unlikely her crew had been reduced from 250 to 120, under the command of Dudley and his first lieutenant Samuel Couchman. After an uneventful six-month cruise along the African coast Chesterfield reached Cape Coast Castle on 19 October 1748. On 21 October Captain Dudley went ashore in the longboat accompanied by most of his officers as well as the Master's mate Thomas Gilliam and the boatswain Roger Gastril. Lieutenant Couchman was the sole officer left on board, with orders to keep Chesterfield at anchor until the captain's return.

=== Mutiny ===
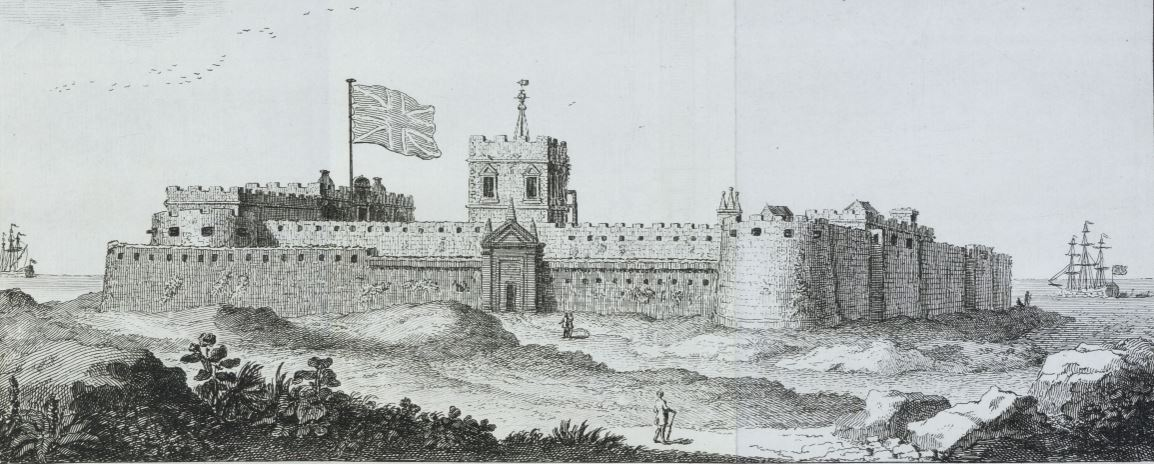
Cape Coast Castle, site of a 1748 mutiny by Chesterfield's crew. From a 1747 work by Jacques-Nicolas Bellin.

Over the next few days Lieutenant Couchman became increasingly drunk and began approaching crew members with the idea of seizing the ship and sailing to the East Indies to start a colony. His plan was eventually supported by Marines lieutenant John Morgan, carpenter Thomas Knight, carpenter's mate John Place and around 30 ordinary seamen. On 26 October the boatswain and mate returned from shore with orders from Dudley to make the ship ready to set sail. Instead they were confronted by a mob led by Couchman, who waved a sword and shouted "Here I am, God damn me, I will stand by you while I have a drop of blood in my body!" The longboat crew were seized and dragged below decks while the boatswain and mate were asked if they would join the mutiny. Both refused and were also imprisoned. The ship was then hurriedly put out to sea, with Couchman threatening to cut the anchor cables if they could not be drawn in swiftly enough for the ship to make her escape. Chesterfield then set sail westward, as Couchman had soured on the idea of an East Indies colony and was now considering piracy in the West Indies to replenish the ship's supplies.

On the following day the boatswain and mate were brought back to Couchman's cabin and offered alcohol, then dismissed and apparently allowed to freely wander the ship. The boatswain immediately went to the ship's gunner who furnished him with pistols. As darkness fell the boatswain, mate and gunner approached around 20 crew members on the quarterdeck and, reminding them of the penalties for piracy, secured their support for retaking the ship. This party then stormed Couchman's cabin and took all the leading mutineers prisoner. Couchman, Morgan, Knight and Place were placed in chains along with 18 other mutineers.

Thus retaken, Chesterfield was sailed to the British port of Bridgetown, Barbados, arriving on 13 December 1748. There she was surrendered to Admiral Henry Osborn commanding the Royal Navy's Leeward Islands Station. The senior mutineers were taken off Chesterfield and imprisoned on the 24-gun sloop Richmond, where Couchman unsuccessfully tried to stir up another mutiny. On 24 February 1749 Admiralty appointed Captain James Campbell to command Chesterfield and bring her to England. (Note: Campbell was appointed to comamnd in February 1749 but the position was thrown into abeyance by Dudley's return. As a result, Campbell did not take up his duties until April 1749.) Before she sailed a merchant ship arrived at Bridgetown carrying Captain Dudley and the other officers who had been stranded in Ghana since the previous year. (Note: Dudley's reappearance briefly delayed Campbell from taking up his duties. Although appointed in February 1749 he did not actually assume the captaincy until April, when it was determined that Dudley would face a court martial.) They were also re-embarked aboard Chesterfield and the ship set sail in company with Richmond, reaching Portsmouth on 25 June.

=== Aftermath ===
"What I have done, I cannot now go from. I was forced into it by the ship's company."

— First Lieutenant Samuel Couchman justifying his decision to mutiny. From testimony at his court martial, July 1749.

Chesterfield's captain and mutineers were court-martialled at Portsmouth in early July 1749. The trial was conducted aboard HMS Invincible under supervision from Admiral Edward Hawke. Captain Dudley was tried for neglect of duty; he was found not guilty but was never given another command. Lieutenants Couchman and Morgan, carpenters Knight and Place and 18 others were tried for mutiny. For his part Couchman claimed he had been "lunatick" with alcohol and had been led to mutiny by others in the crew. Marine lieutenant Morgan, described by Admiral Hawke as "extremely weak and ignorant," also denied any meaningful role but was condemned by hearsay that he had discussed a mutiny with Couchman several days earlier. The carpenter Thomas Knight and most of the ordinary seamen claimed they had merely followed Couchman's orders. Only carpenter's mate John Place admitted to mutiny, pleading guilty and throwing himself on the mercy of the court.

At the conclusion of the court martial Couchman and Morgan were sentenced to be shot. As death by shooting was a punishment informally reserved for commissioned officers, Knight, Place and three others were to be hanged. Four more seamen were convicted of deserting their duties and sentenced to life imprisonment with penal transportation to Gibraltar. The remaining crew members were acquitted and allowed to return to Navy service. After the sentences were issued, Place wrote to Couchman, forgiving him for inciting mutiny and urging him to "secure a blessed Eternity ... with God's assistance, and to die like a man." Couchman's written reply was brief: "Mr Place, you will die like a villain." The mutineers were executed in late July 1749. For his part in retaking Chesterfield the boatswain Roger Gastril was released from sea service and appointed as a Master Attendant at Woolwich Dockyard.

The 1748 Treaty of Aix-la-Chapelle brought an end to the war between Britain, Spain and France, and Chesterfield was declared surplus to the Navy's needs and decommissioned at Portsmouth Dockyard. She was in poor condition after her African service, and in early 1751 underwent repairs worth £2,249 or nearly one-third of her original construction cost. Work was completed in November 1751 but Chesterfield remained out of service at Portsmouth for another three years.

== Seven Years' War ==
Hostilities against France resumed in 1754 with French and Indian War in North America and the despatch of the British Army's Braddock expedition to dislodge France from its Canadian forts. From March 1755 the Royal Navy began recruiting additional seamen for what would become the Seven Years' War against France and Spain. More than 35 decommissioned navy vessels were returned to service, including Chesterfield under Captain William Lloyd. Seaworthy by December 1755, Chesterfield was assigned to Mediterranean service. In January 1756 she was escorting a British merchant convoy to the Spanish port of Cádiz when heavy weather forced her to leave her station. The merchant vessels proceeded safely to the port, while Chesterfield retired to Gibraltar. There she was joined to a fleet under the command of Admiral John Byng, with orders to relieve the British garrison at Minorca.

=== Battle of Minorca ===
Byng's fleet sailed from Gibraltar on 8 May 1756, reaching Minorca ten days later to discover that most of the island was overrun by French troops. On 19 May Byng sent Chesterfield and two small frigates toward the British-held Port Mahon, to observe French positions surrounding the port and deliver messages to garrison commander General Blakeney. (Note: The other vessels sent to Port Mahon with Chesterfield were the 24-gun Phoenix and the 20-gun Dolphin.) However the French Mediterranean fleet was sighted as the ships drew near the island, whereupon Byng signalled for Chesterfield and the frigates to return to the main fleet.

Byng then ordered his fleet into a line of battle to engage the French. The 44-gun Chesterfield was too small for this duty and remained at a distance from the engagement which began in the early afternoon of 19 May. At sunset she was assigned to guard the 64-gun HMS Intrepid which had suffered damage to her masts and was struggling to keep up with the fleet. Both Intrepid and Chesterfield subsequently fell behind, losing contact with the rest of Byng's forces and only rejoining the fleet on the morning of 20 May. On their return Byng designated Chesterfield as a hospital ship, taking on a large proportion of the 165 wounded men from other vessels.

Thus loaded with the injured, Chesterfield returned with the rest of Byng's fleet, arriving in Gibraltar on 19 June 1756. (Note: Admiral Byng returned to England, where he was court-martialled for making insufficient effort to engage the French. Found guilty, he was executed at Portsmouth on 14 March 1757.) Captain Lloyd was subsequently posted to the 60-gun Princess Louisa and was replaced by Captain Chaloner Ogle, brother-in-law of his namesake who had once served as Admiral of the Fleet. Ogle briefly returned Chesterfield to Mediterranean patrol, but was replaced in August 1757 by Captain Julian Legge whose orders were to set sail for the Caribbean. (Note: Legge was an experienced captain, with previous postings to the 54-gun fourth rate Bristol and the sloop Shoreham. He was also familiar with North American waters having spent three years stationed in South Carolina. These naval accomplishments were somewhat tarnished by his personal conduct: in 1756, prior to being appointed to Chesterfield, he was court martialled for making suspiciously large requisitions for naval stores and for unapproved renovations to his captain's quarters. For these offences he was fined £50.)

=== North America ===
With Legge in command, Chesterfield departed England on 1 April 1758 with a convoy of British troops headed for Virginia. On arrival in early June, she began a patrol along the York River to hunt merchant shipping engaged in trade with the French. By mid-August two such vessels were seized: a French-owned brigantine carrying a load of rum and sugar for sale in New York, and the Prudent Hannah, an English ship carrying flour, meat, beans and 15 French prisoners bound for exchange in Port au Prince. Prudent Hannah was unarmed and her crew offered no resistance when Chesterfield overhauled her on the river. However her captain, Paul Tew protested his innocence of the charge of trading with the enemy and claimed his cargo was simply personal supplies to sustain those on board. He also produced letters from the colonial government of Rhode Island authorising a prisoner exchange in return for British sailors held by the French. He was held aboard Chesterfield until the ship returned to Richmond and a trial was convened in the Virginia Vice-Admiralty Court. The Court rejected Tew's claims; Prudent Hannah and her cargo were thereafter sold at auction in Richmond with one-third of the proceeds paid as prize money to Legge and Chesterfield's crew. (Note: The remaining prize money was divided between the British government and the Virginia colonial administration. Tew raised money for an appeal of the Court's ruling but chose not to proceed.)

While Chesterfield had been engaged on her York River patrol the bulk of the Royal Navy fleet in North America had successfully laid siege to Louisbourg, the principal French fortress on the St Lawrence River. With Louisbourg's fall came around 3,600 French prisoners of war and 216 cannons captured during the siege. Chesterfield was assigned to a squadron under George Rodney transporting the captured men and equipment to England, arriving in early 1759.

=== Later voyages ===
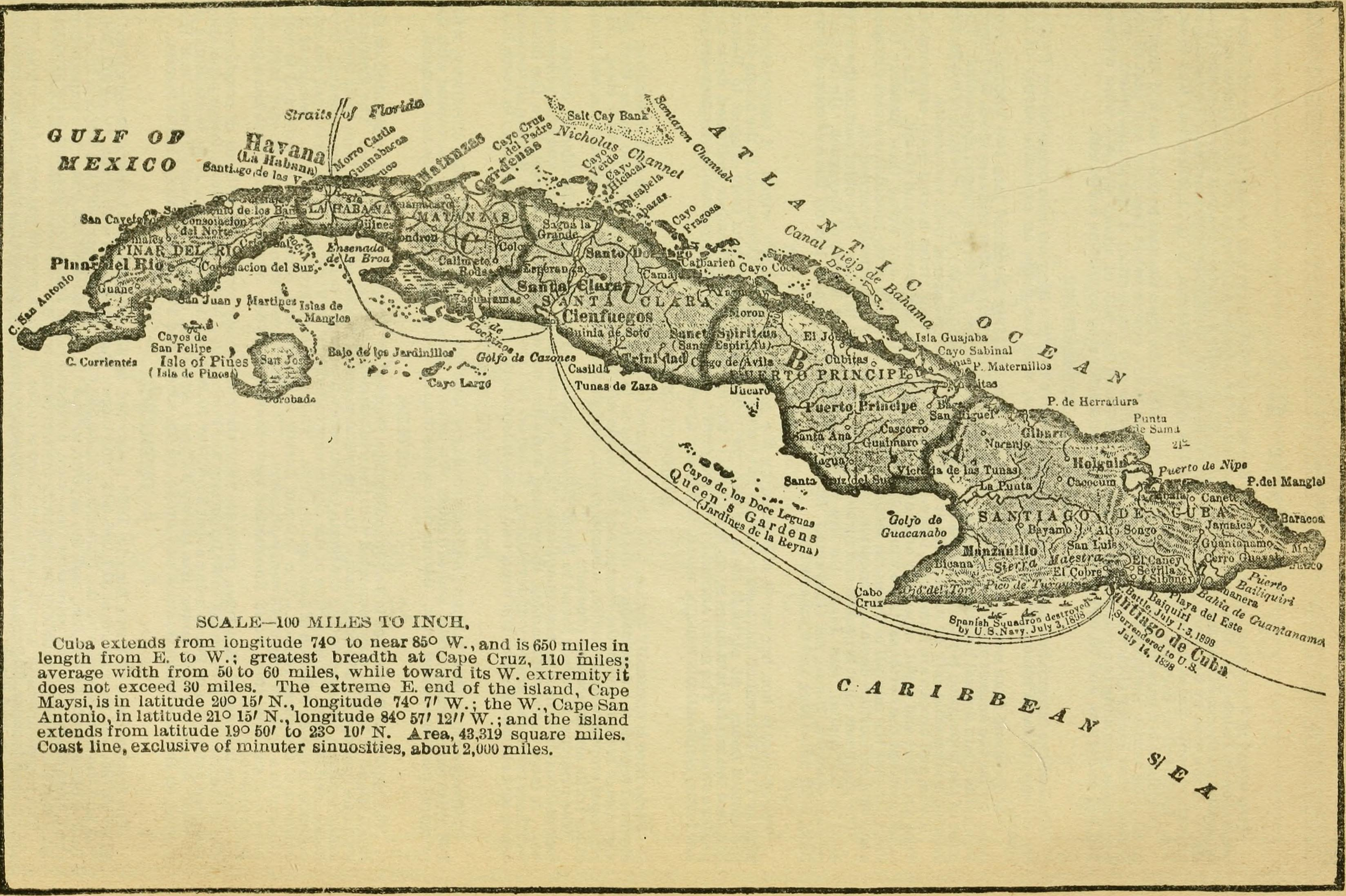
Canal Viejo de Bahama (Old Bahama Channel, centre right) where Chesterfield was lost at sea in July 1762. From The World Almanac and Encyclopedia, 1899

On arrival in England, Captain Legge was promoted to the 64-gun third rate Trident. Chesterfield's command was transferred to Captain John Scaife. The vessel was returned to the Caribbean as a convoy escort, departing England in August 1759. Too small to stand the line of battle and too slow to catch privateers, Chesterfield spent her years under Scaife's command escorting troop transports from England to the American colonies. Chesterfield's sole exceptional duty during this period came in 1760 when she was again in West Africa. In June 1760 she was cruising close to shore near Cape Palmas in what is now Liberia, when she was assailed by a fleet of pirate canoes, the occupants of which swarmed up her sides to storm the decks. The attackers were eventually driven off leaving 50 to 60 dead and 18 captured. Chesterfield then continued eastward to Cape Coast Castle, the site of Couchman's abortive mutiny in 1747. There Scaife sold his 18 prisoners into slavery and Chesterfield returned to England where she was again assigned to trans-Atlantic convoy work. In this role Chesterfield sailed from Portsmouth on 9 May 1761, reaching Boston 10 September in company with a flotilla of store ships intended to resupply the New England colonies. On 4 December she was again off Portsmouth preparing to escort a convoy to Virginia.

This would be her last visit to England. On 24 July 1762 Chesterfield was escorting troop transports bound for the Siege of Havana, when she was caught in a storm while traversing the Old Bahama Channel off northern Cuba. Never a strong sailer in heavy weather, she was run ashore and wrecked at Cayo Confite along with four of the transport vessels. The crew were able to abandon ship and seek safety on the shore, but their vessel could not be saved. The wreck also marked the end of Captain Scaife's naval career. Retiring to England, he was selected as Master of London's Trinity House, and died in 1773.
