= Balearic Islands expedition =

Balearic Islands expedition may refer to:

- 1113–1115 Balearic Islands expedition
- Ottoman raid on the Balearic islands (1501)
- Ottoman invasion of the Balearic islands (1558)

== See also ==
- Invasion of Minorca
- Battle of Majorca
