= Battle of Minorca (1756) =

1756 battle of the Seven Years' War

Coordinates: 39.8900°N 4.3500°E

- Part of the Seven Years' War
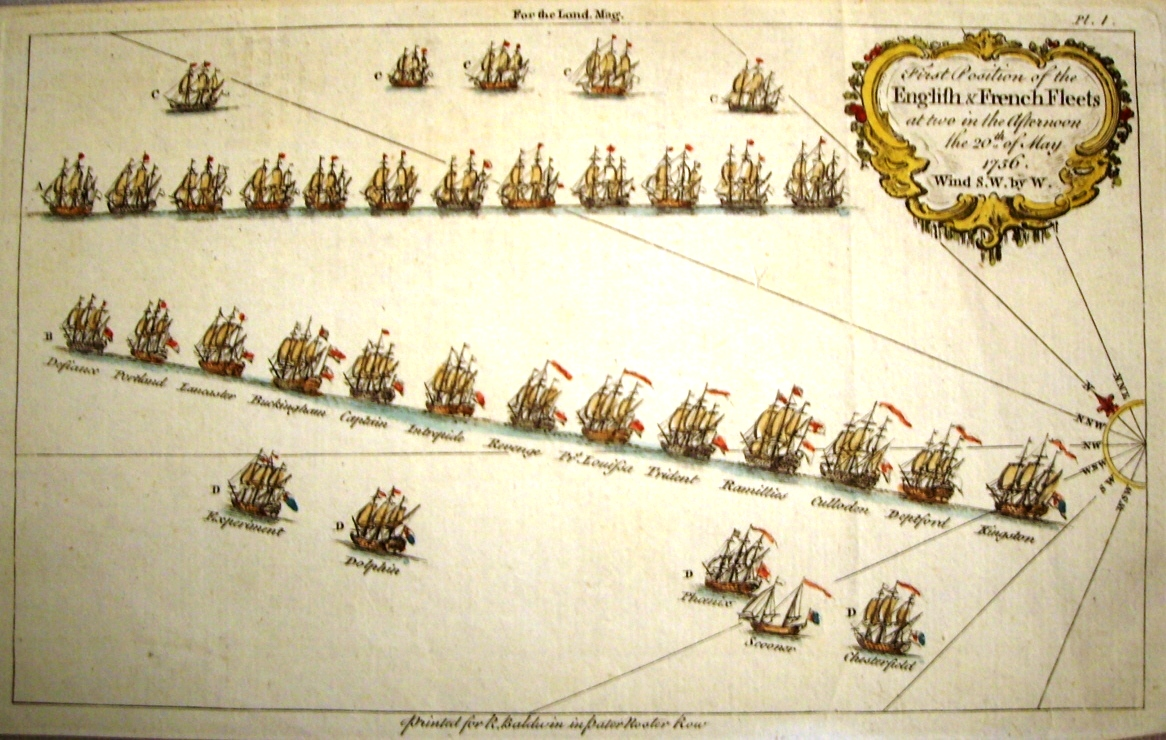
- Engraving of the battle
Date	20 May 1756
Location	Off Minorca, Mediterranean Sea
Result	French victory

Belligerents
France	Great Britain

Commanders and leaders
Roland-Michel Barrin de La Galissonière	John Byng

Strength
12 ships of the line 5 frigates	12 ships of the line 7 frigates

Casualties and losses
38 killed 184 wounded	45 killed 162 wounded

The Battle of Minorca was a fleet action fought on 20 May 1756 between the French and British navies during the Seven Years' War. Fought off Minorca shortly after the war began, it was the opening naval battle of the war's European theatre and resulted in a French strategic victory. The decision by the British fleet's commander, Admiral of the Blue John Byng, to withdraw to Gibraltar led directly to the fall of Minorca. Byng's failure to save Minorca led to a controversial court-martial which resulted in his execution for "failure to do his utmost" to relieve the siege of the British garrison on Minorca.

== Background ==
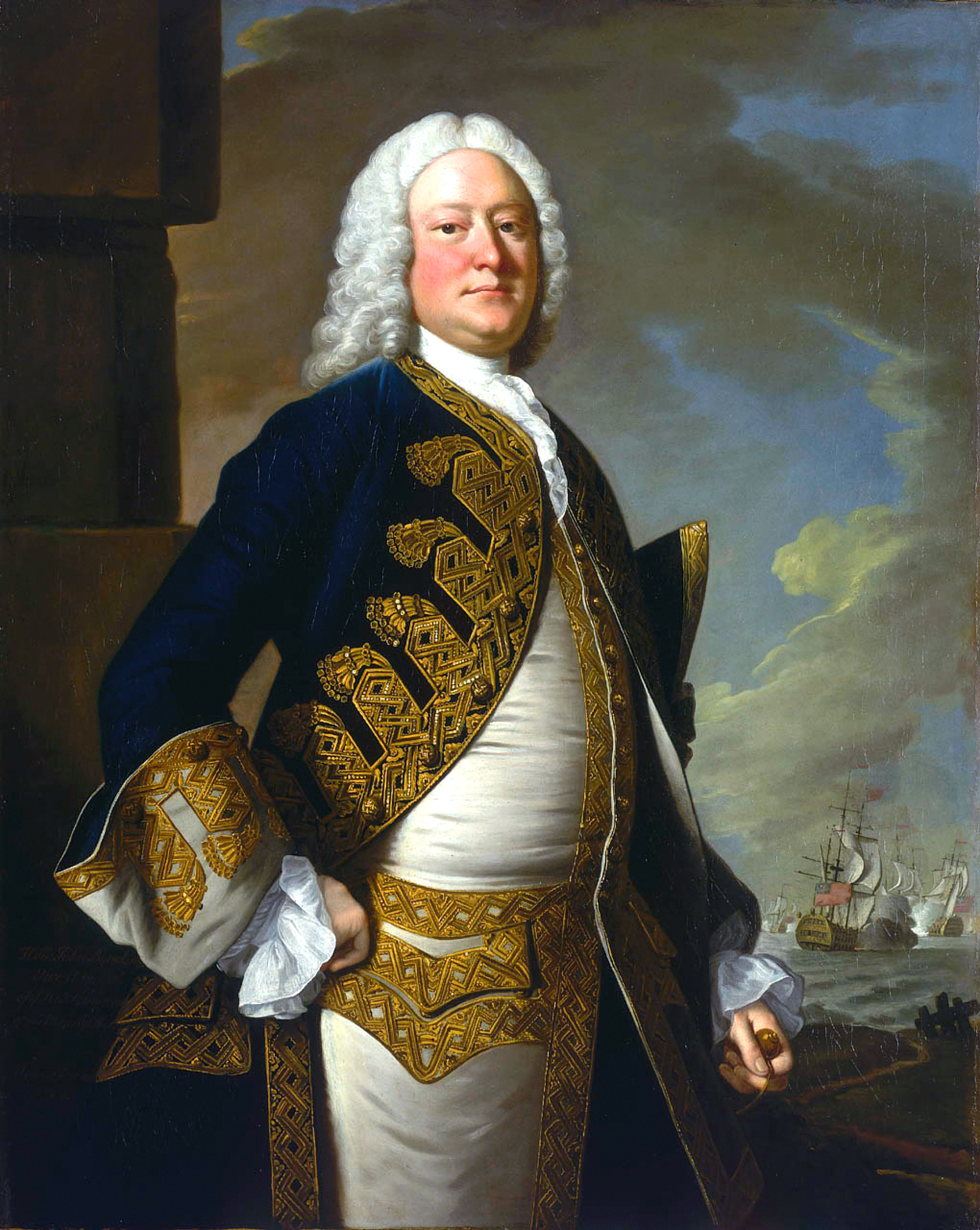
Portrait of Admiral Byng by Thomas Hudson, 1749

The French had been menacing the British-held garrison on Minorca, which had come under British control during the War of the Spanish Succession in 1708. Great Britain and France had commenced hostilities in the New World colonies earlier in 1754 (the French and Indian War), and at this point the conflict was not going well for Great Britain. The government was anxious to protect her presence closer to home, and was concerned that the French might even be planning to invade Great Britain itself (as France had attempted in previous wars by supporting the Stuart claimants to the throne during the Jacobite Wars).

The long-expected French move on Minorca finally caused the British government to act, albeit belatedly, and a squadron of 10 ships of the line was dispatched from Gibraltar to its defence, under the command of John Byng (then a Vice-Admiral, but quickly promoted to Admiral for the purpose). Despite having considerable intelligence of the strength of the French fleet at Toulon that was designated for the invasion of Minorca, the ships allocated to Byng were all in a poor state of repair and undermanned.

== Prelude ==
When Byng and his fleet, now numbering 13 ships of the line (having been reinforced by ships of the Minorca squadron that had escaped the island), arrived off Minorca on 19 May, they found the island already overrun by French troops, with only the garrison of St. Philip's Castle in Port Mahon holding out. Byng's orders were to relieve the garrison, but a French squadron of 12 ships of the line and 5 frigates intervened as the afternoon wore on. The two fleets positioned themselves, and battle was drawn up on the morning of the following day.

== Battle ==
Facing 12 French ships of the line, Byng formed his 12 ships of the line into a single line of battle and approached the head of the French line on a parallel course while maintaining the weather gage. He then ordered his ships to go about and come alongside their opposite numbers in the French fleet. However, the poor signalling capability of the times caused confusion and delay in closing. The British van suffered heavy damage from their more heavily armed French adversaries, while the rear of Byng's fleet, including his flagship, failed to come within effective cannon range. During the battle Byng displayed considerable caution and an over-reliance on standard fighting procedures, and several of his ships were badly damaged. He proceeded to hold a council of war, at which all the senior officers present agreed that the British fleet stood no chance of further damaging the French fleet or of relieving the garrison. Byng therefore gave orders for his fleet to return to Gibraltar.

== Aftermath ==
The battle could hardly be considered anything other than a French victory in the light of Byng failing to press on to relieve the garrison or pursue the French fleet which inaction resulted in severe criticism. The Admiralty, perhaps concerned to divert attention from its own lack of preparation for the disastrous venture, charged him for breaching the Articles of War by failing to do all he could to fulfill his orders and support the garrison; he was court-martialled, found guilty and sentenced to death, and – despite pleas for clemency – executed on 14 March 1757 aboard HMS Monarch in Portsmouth harbour.

Byng's execution is referred to in Voltaire's novel Candide with the line Dans ce pays-ci, il est bon de tuer de temps en temps un amiral pour encourager les autres – "In this country, it is good from time to time to kill an admiral to encourage the others." Despite William Pitt's eagerness to regain the island, a British expedition was not sent to recapture it for the remainder of the war. It was eventually returned to Britain following the Treaty of Paris, in exchange for the French West Indies and Belle-Île.

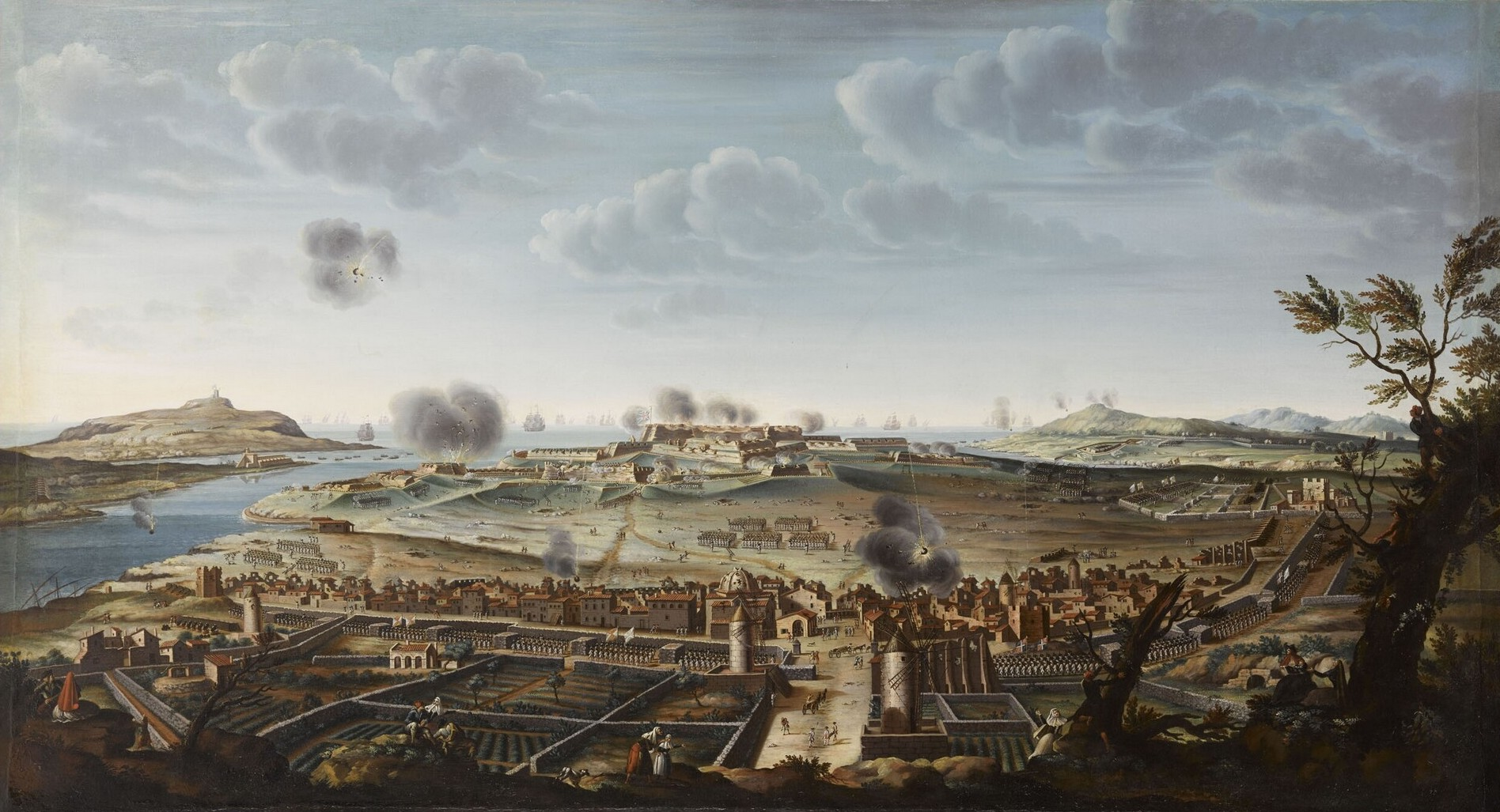
Attack and capture of Fort St. Philip on the island of Minorca, 29 June 1756, after the naval battle.

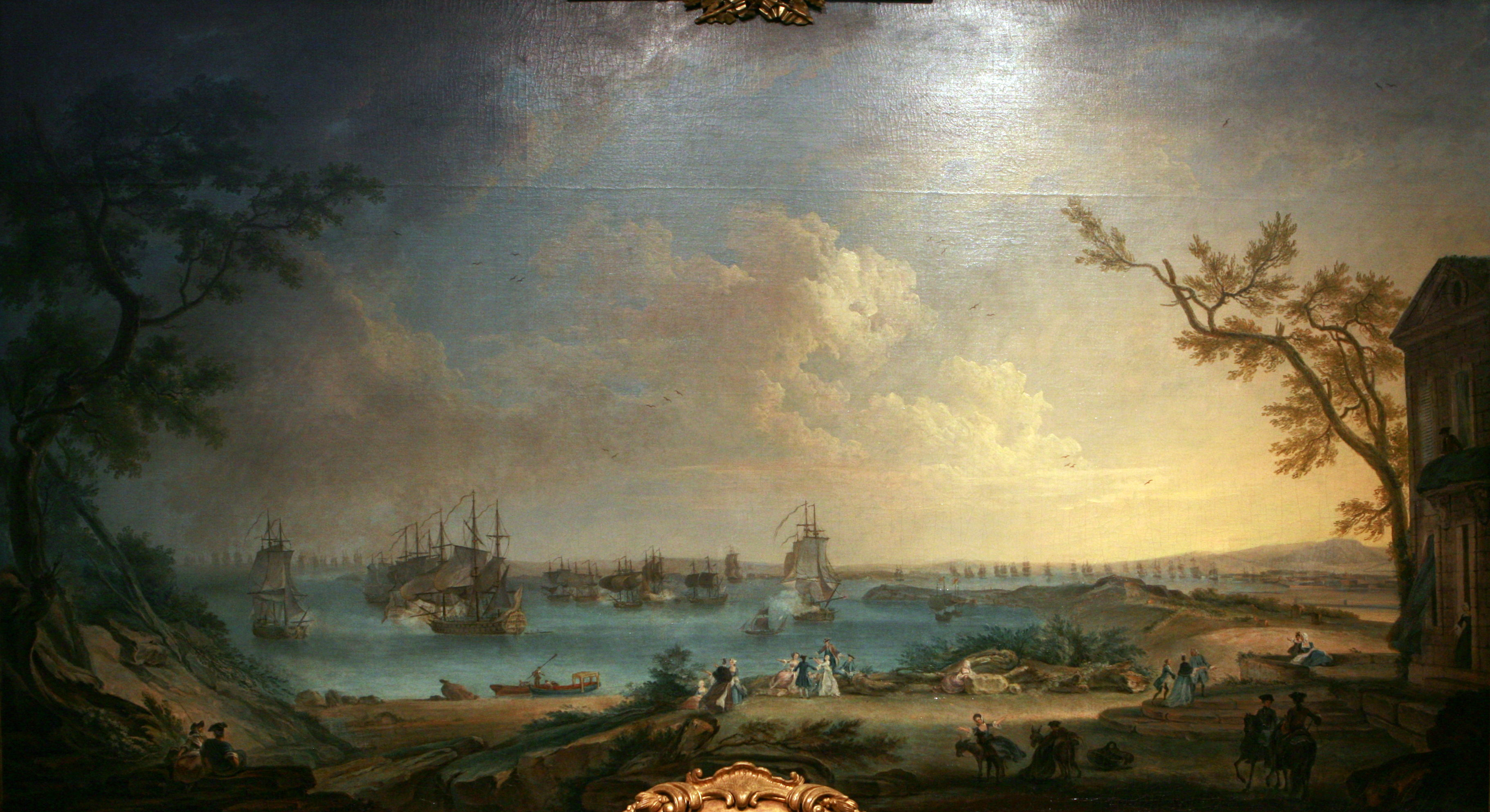
The departure of the French squadron on 10 April 1756 for the attack against Port Mahon, by Nicolas Ozanne

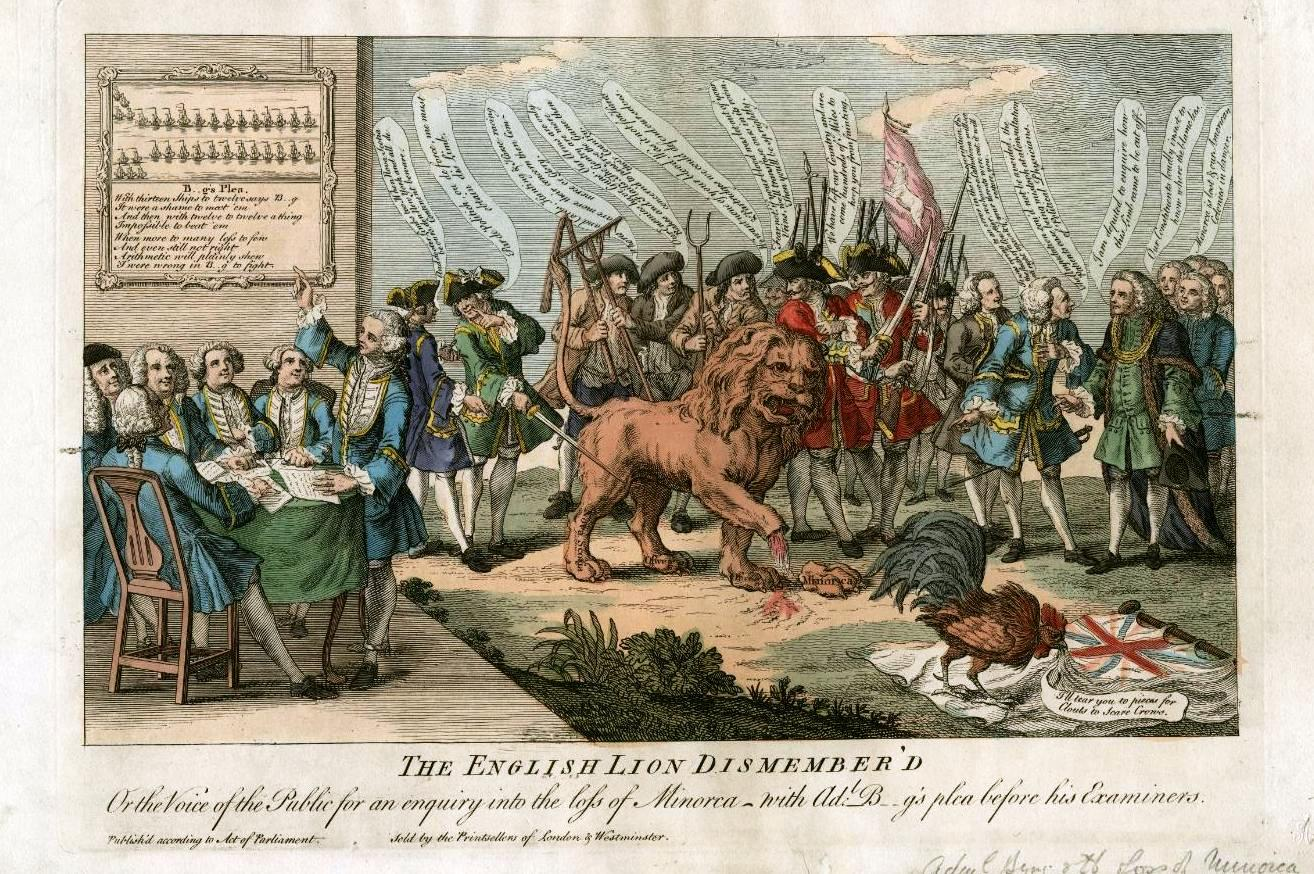
The English Lion dismembered after the French conquer the island of Menorca.

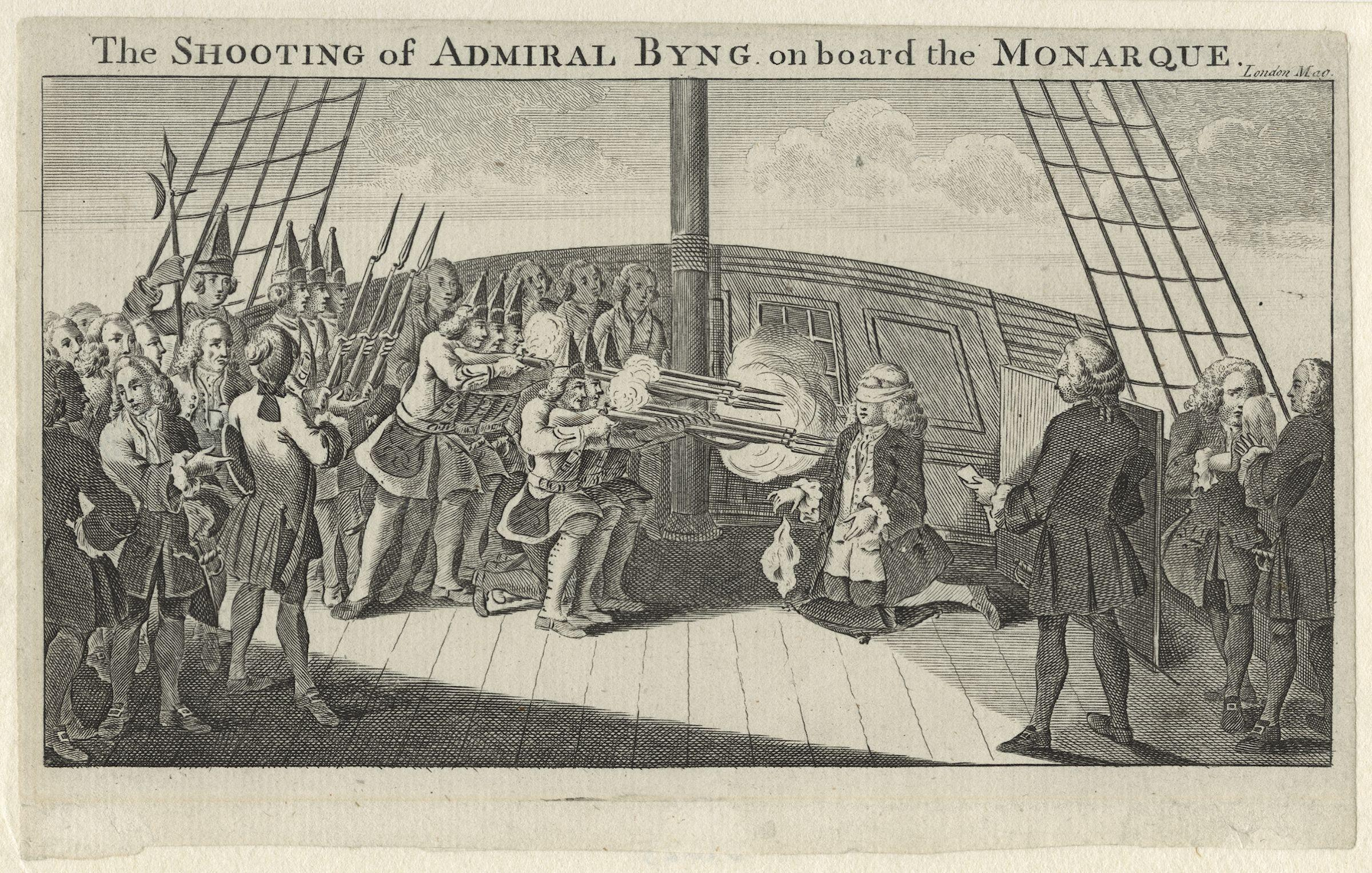
The Shooting of Admiral Byng, by unknown artist.

== Order of battle ==
In order of their place in the line of battle:

=== British fleet ===
British fleet
Ship	Rate	Guns	Commander	Casualties			Notes
Ship	Rate	Guns	Commander	Killed	Wounded	Total	Notes
Defiance	Third rate	60	Captain Thomas Andrews	14	45	59	
Portland	Fourth rate	50	Captain Patrick Baird	6	20	26	
Lancaster	Third rate	66	Captain George Edgcumbe	1	14	15	
Buckingham	Third rate	68	Rear-Admiral Temple West; Captain Michael Everitt	3	7	10	
Captain	Third rate	64	Captain Charles Catford	6	30	36	
Intrepid	Third rate	64	Captain James Young	9	39	48	
Revenge	Third rate	64	Captain Frederick Cornewall	0	0	0	
Princess Louisa	Third rate	60	Captain Thomas Noel	3	13	16	
Trident	Third rate	64	Captain Philip Durell	0	0	0	
Ramillies	Second rate	90	Admiral John Byng; Captain Arthur Gardiner	0	0	0	
Culloden	Third rate	74	Captain Henry Ward	0	0	0	
Kingston	Third rate	60	Captain William Parry	0	0	0	
Deptford	Fourth rate	50	Captain John Amherst	0	0	0	
Casualty summary				42	168	210	

=== Attached frigates ===
Ship	Guns	Captain	Rate
Chesterfield	40	Captain William Lloyd	Fifth-rate frigate
Experiment	20	Captain James Gilchrist	Sixth-rate frigate
Dolphin	20	Commander Benjamin Marlow	Sixth-rate frigate
Phoenix	20	Captain Augustus Hervey	Sixth-rate frigate
Fortune	14	Commander Jervis Maplesden	Unrated brig-sloop

=== French fleet ===
French fleet
Ship	Rate	Guns	Commander	Casualties			Notes
Ship	Rate	Guns	Commander	Killed	Wounded	Total	Notes
Orphée		64	Pierre-Antoine de Raymondis d'Éoux	10	9	19	
Hippopotame		50	Henri de Rochemore	2	10	12	
Redoutable		74	Chef d'Escadre Pierre-André de Glandevès du Castellet	12	39	51	
Sage		64	Captain Duruen	0	8	8	
Guerrier		74	René Villars de la Brosse-Raquin	0	43	43	
Fier		50	Captain d'Erville	0	4	4	
Foudroyant		84	Lieutenant général Roland-Michel Barrin de La Galissonière	2	10	12	
Téméraire		74	Captain Beaumont	0	15	15	
Content		64	Joseph de Sabran	5	19	24	
Lion		64	Paul-Hippolyte de Beauvilliers-Saint-Aignan	2	7	9	
Couronne		74	Chef d'Escadre Jean-François de La Clue-Sabran	0	3	3	
Triton		64	Captain Mercier	5	14	19	
Casualty summary				38	181	219	

=== Attached frigates ===
Ship	Guns	Captain
Junon	46	Captain Beausfier
Rose	26	Captain Costebelle
Gracieuse	26	Captain Marquizan
Topaze	24	Captain Carne
Nymphe	26	Captain Callian

== See also ==
- HMS Dolphin
- Arthur Phillip, an otherwise notable midshipman
- The Expeditionary Corps Embarks for Minorca at the Port of Marseille Under the Command of Marshal de Richelieu

== Bibliography ==
- Anderson, Fred. Crucible of War: The Seven Years' War and the fate of Empire in British North America, 1754-1766. Faber and Faber, 2000.
- Brown, Peter Douglas. William Pitt, Earl of Chatham: The Great Commoner. George Allen & Unwin, 1978.
- Dull, Jonathan R. The French Navy and the Seven Years' War. University of Nebraska, 2005.
- Hamley, Sir Edward Bruce (1877). Voltaire. Edinburgh; London: Wm. Blackwood & Sons. p. 177.
- Lambert, Andrew. Admirals: The Naval Commanders Who Made Britain Great. Faber and Faber, 2009.
- McGuffie, T. H. "The Defence of Minorca 1756" History Today (1951) 1#10 pp 49-55. online
