= List of invasions of Menorca =

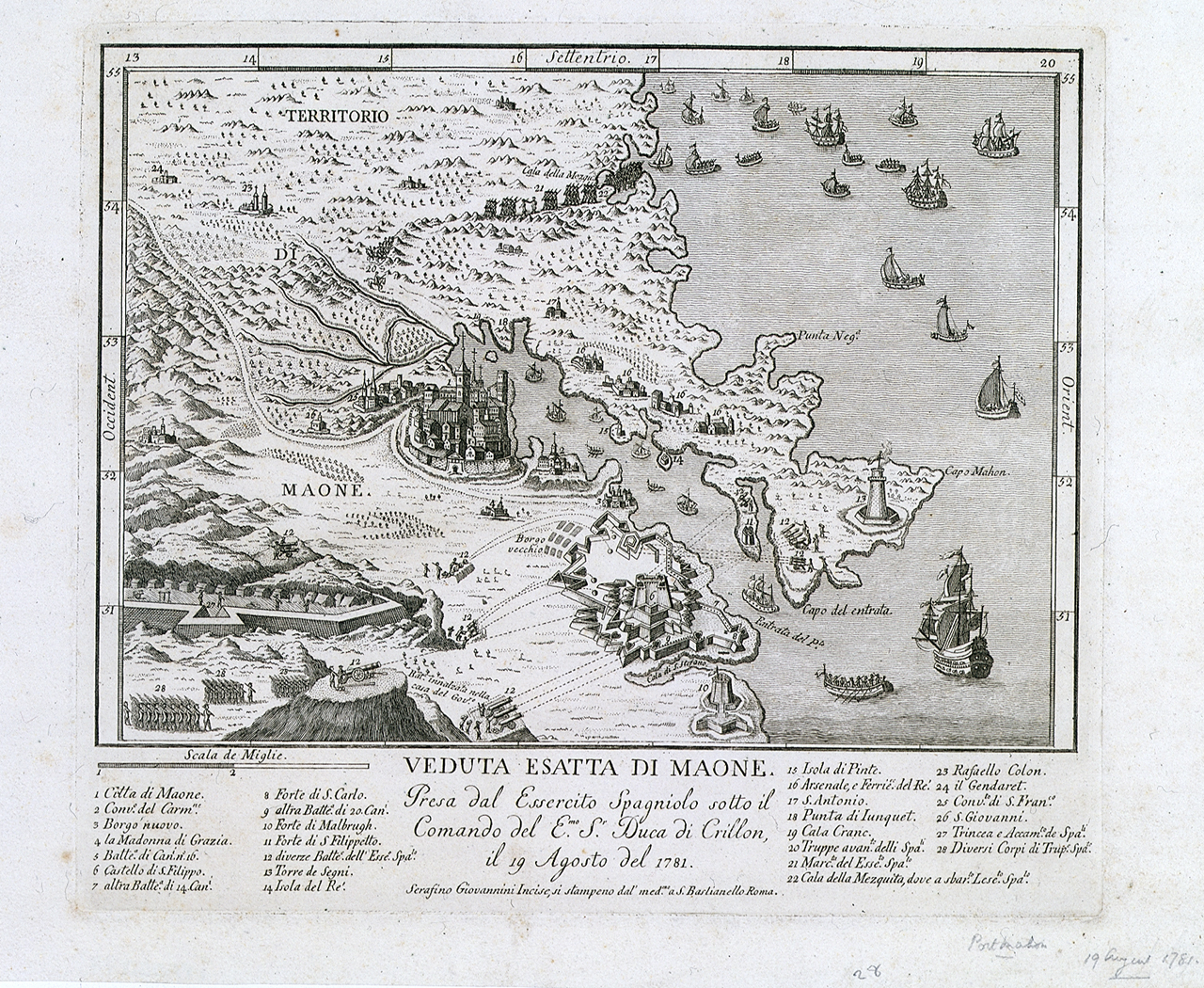
1781 engraving of the Franco-Spanish invasion of Menorca during the American Revolutionary War

The island of Menorca in the Mediterranean Sea has been invaded on numerous occasions. The first recorded invasion occurred in 252 BC, when the Carthaginians arrived. The name of the island's chief city, Mahón, derives from the name of Carthaginian leader Mago Barca. The name of the island is of Latin origin, and dates from after the Roman conquest, led by Quintus Caecilius Metellus in 123 BC, during a campaign which earned him the agnomen Balearicus.

The island was briefly subsumed under the Vandal Kingdom around 427, but it was eventually reconquered by Belisarius and incorporated in the Byzantine Empire. It was an obscure province increasingly outside the sphere of Byzantine influence for the next four centuries. Around 859 a Viking incursion destroyed or damaged many Byzantine churches. In 903 the island was invaded by the Emirate of Córdoba, resulting in the introduction of Islam and renewed contacts with the Iberian peninsula. The Taifa of Menorca, the last Muslim state on the island, accepted the authority of the Crown of Aragon in 1231–32, and was finally conquered in 1287–88; its Muslim population being either ransomed or enslaved. The island came under attack from the Ottoman Empire in 1535, when Mahón was sacked, and again in 1558, when Mahón and Ciutadella were plundered.

During the War of the Spanish Succession, the island was occupied by the French in 1707 with no military action, but in 1708 it was captured by Anglo-Dutch forces, and British sovereignty was recognised in the 1713 Peace of Utrecht. The French returned in 1756, defeating the British at sea, and capturing Fort St Philip. In 1763, at the end of the Seven Years' War, the French ceded the island back to Britain. During the American Revolutionary War, the French sided with Spain and invaded Menorca in 1781. It was a part of Spain until being recaptured by the British in 1798, during the French Revolutionary Wars. Britain handed Menorca back to Spain under the 1802 Treaty of Amiens, having chosen to keep Malta as a Mediterranean base instead.

During the Spanish Civil War, the island remained loyal to the Republic, but was captured by Nationalist forces in February 1939.

== Main invasions ==
- Sack of Mahón (1535)
- Raid of the Balearic Islands (1558)
- Capture of Minorca (1708)
- Siege of Fort St Philip (1756)
- Invasion of Minorca (1781)
- Capture of Minorca (1798)
- Battle of Minorca (1939)
