= Junon =

Junon, the French spelling of the ancient Roman goddess Juno, may refer to:

== Ships ==
- French ship Junon, various French Navy ships
- HMS Junon, two Royal Navy ships which retained their names after being captured from the French
- Gloire-class frigate, a French frigate class sometimes called the Junon class

== Other uses ==
- Junon (magazine), a Japanese monthly fashion magazine
