= HMS Cornwall (1761) =

74-gun Royal Navy ship of the line

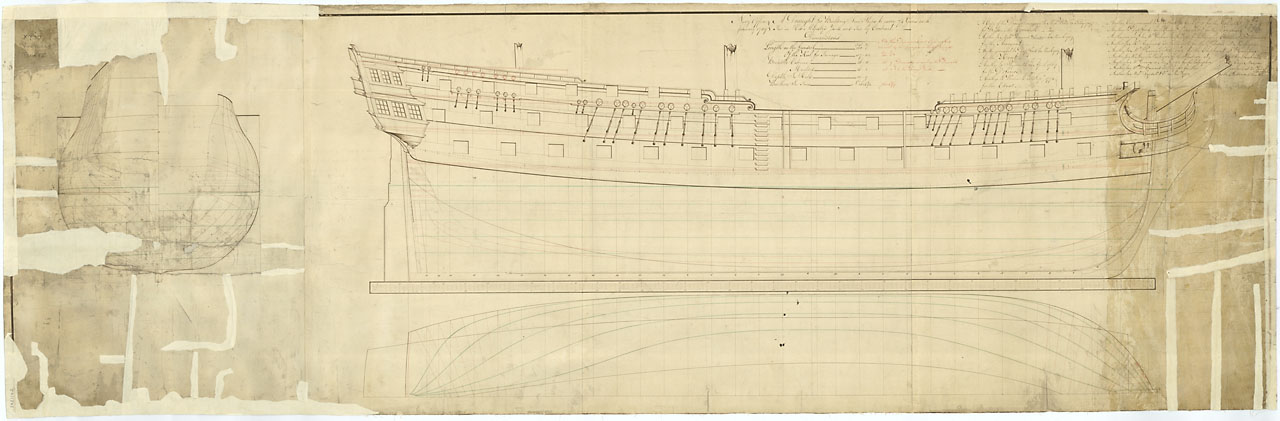
- Cornwall

History

Great Britain
- Name: HMS Cornwall
- Ordered: 13 December 1758
- Builder: Wells, Deptford
- Launched: 19 May 1761
- Fate: Burnt, 30 June 1780

General characteristics
- Class & type: Arrogant-class ship of the line
- Tons burthen: 1,634 bm
- Length: 168 ft (51 m) (gundeck)
- Beam: 46 ft 9 in (14.25 m)
- Depth of hold: 19 ft 9 in (6.02 m)
- Propulsion: Sails
- Sail plan: Full-rigged ship
- Armament: 74 guns: Gundeck: 28 × 32 pdrs; Upper gundeck: 28 × 18 pdrs; Quarterdeck: 14 × 9 pdrs; Forecastle: 4 × 9 pdrs

HMS Cornwall was a 74-gun third-rate ship of the line of the Royal Navy, launched on 19 May 1761 at Deptford.

The ship was named in honour of James Cornewall, who had been killed at the battle of Toulon in 1744, and was initially commanded by his cousin Frederick Cornewall who lost an arm in the same engagement.

She served in the English Channel until the end of the Seven Years' War in 1763. After service as a guard ship at Plymouth, she was sent to North America to serve in the American Revolutionary War. May, 1778 under command of Capt. Timothy Edwards. She arrived in New York on 30 July 1779 and just ten days later was in a confrontation with the French Navy. Later that year she was deployed to the West Indies where she was badly damaged in action off Grenada and again off Martinique in 1780. She was sent to St Lucia for repairs, but her damage was too extensive. Deemed unserviceable, she was destroying by burning on 30 June 1780.
