= HMS Conqueror (1758) =

Ship of the line of the Royal Navy

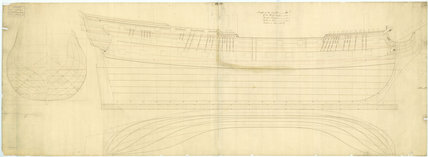
- Conqueror

History

Great Britain
- Name: HMS Conqueror
- Builder: Barnard, Harwich
- Launched: 24 May 1758
- Fate: Wrecked, 1760

General characteristics
- Class & type: 68-gun third rate ship of the line
- Tons burthen: 143211/94 (bm)
- Length: 160 ft (49 m) (gundeck)
- Beam: 45 ft (14 m)
- Depth of hold: 19 ft 4 in (5.89 m)
- Propulsion: Sails
- Sail plan: Full-rigged ship
- Armament: 68 guns: Gundeck: 26 × 32 pdrs; Upper gundeck: 28 × 18 pdrs; Quarterdeck: 12 × 9 pdrs; Forecastle: 2 × 9 pdrs

HMS Conqueror was a 68-gun third rate ship of the line of the Royal Navy, built by John Barnard and launched on 24 May 1758 at Harwich initially under command of Captain Robert Harland.

Commanded by Captain William Lloyd in the Battle of Lagos.

While under the command of Lloyd, she was wrecked on the rocks of St Nicholas Island off Plymouth Sound on 26 October 1760.
