= HMS Sphinx (1748) =

Frigate of the Royal Navy

History

Great Britain
- Name: HMS Sphinx
- Operator: Royal Navy
- Ordered: 26 September 1747
- Builder: John Allen, Rotherhithe
- Laid down: November 1747
- Launched: 10 December 1748
- Completed: 6 February 1748 at Rotherhithe
- Commissioned: September 1748
- Fate: Sold 28 August 1770 to break up

General characteristics
- Class & type: sixth-rate frigate
- Tons burthen: 520 57/94 (bm)
- Length: 113 ft 8 in (34.65 m) (gundeck); 93 ft 6 in (28.50 m) (keel)
- Beam: 32 ft 4.25 in (9.8616 m)
- Depth of hold: 11 ft 0 in (3.35 m)
- Sail plan: Full-rigged ship
- Complement: 160 officers and men
- Armament: Lower deck: 2 × 9-pounder guns (aft); Upper deck: 20 × 9-pounder guns; Quarterdeck: 2 × 3-pounder guns

HMS Sphinx was a 24-gun sixth-rate frigate of the Royal Navy. The ship was built to the 1745 Establishment design drawn by the Surveyor of the Navy.

The ship was commissioned in September 1748 under Captain William Lloyd, and transported Governor Edward Cornwallis to Nova Scotia where he established Halifax. The ship served in Nova Scotia until early 1750, before being refitted at Sheerness. She then moved to the Mediterranean, before returning to Home Waters in 1751, where she was briefly off Ireland. In late 1751, now under Captain Edward Wheeler, she was deployed to the African coast and thence to Jamaica. Returned to England, she was refitted at Deptford in 1755 and then recommissioned under Captain James Gambier for a fresh deployment to Jamaica. On 3 December 1755, the Sphinx brought a French merchant vessel she had captured into Kingston. She returned to England in late 1758 under Captain John Dalrymple to pay off into reserve, seeing no further service until she was sold for breaking up in 1770.
