= French ship Junon =

Ten ships of the French Navy have borne the name Junon, in honour of Juno:

- Junon (1747), a 44-gun two-decked ship ("partly ship of the line, partly frigate")
- Junon (1778), a 32-gun Charmante-class frigate
- Junon (1779), a 14-gun corvette
- Junon (1782), a 40-gun Minerve-class frigate
- Junon (1797), a Venetian galley
- Junon (1806), a Gloire-class 40-gun frigate.
- Amélie (1814), a 46-gun frigate renamed Junon in 1814
- Junon (1861), a 28-gun frigate begun as a sailing frigate but launched as a steam frigate
- Junon (1935), a Minerve-class submarine of 1935
- Junon (S648), a Daphné-class submarine, completed 1966 – decommissioned 1996
Ships of the French Navy named Junon
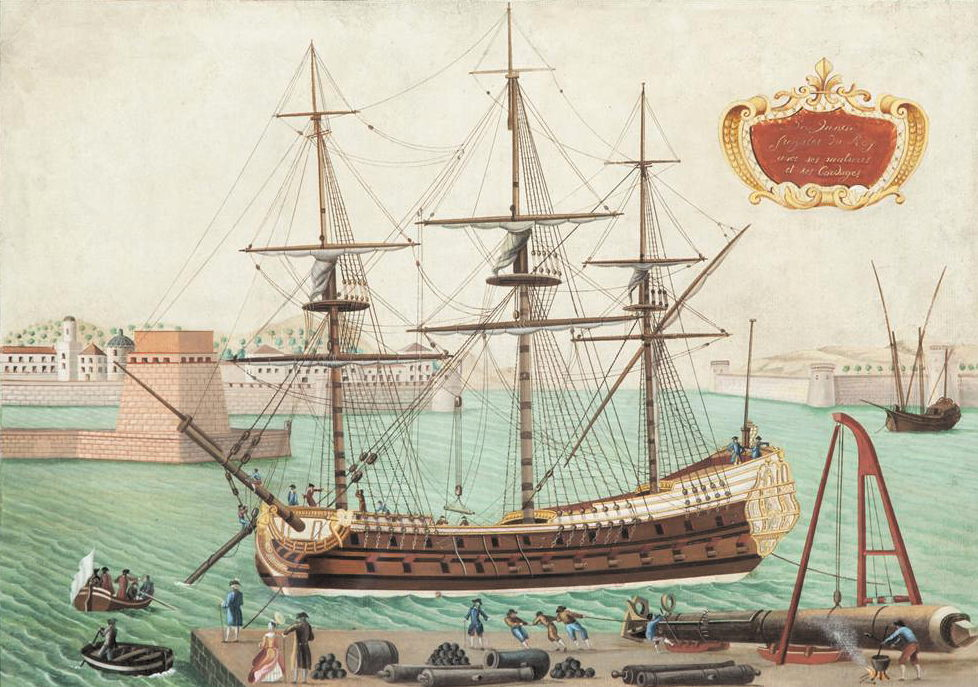
Junon (1747)

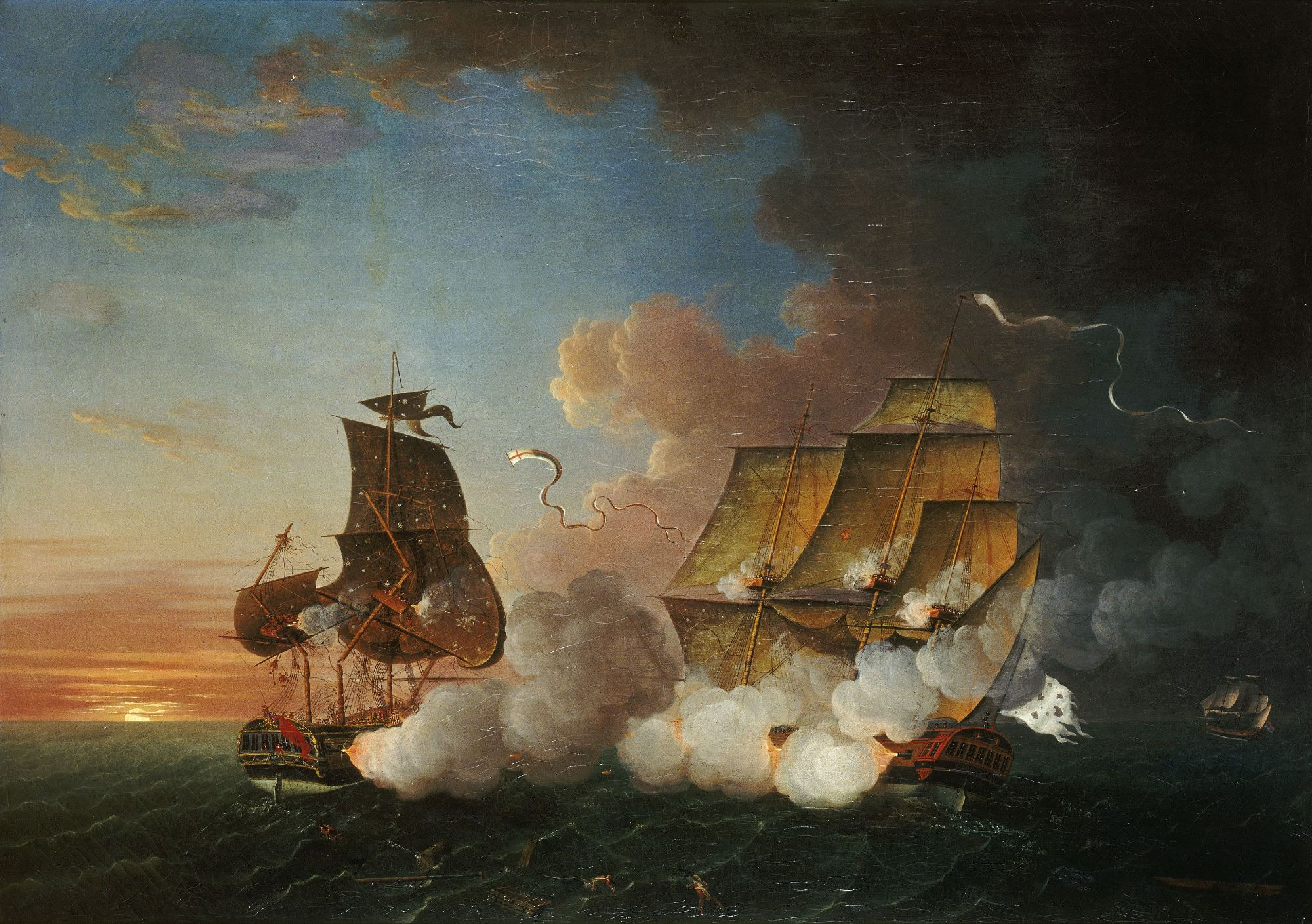
Capture of HMS Fox by Junon (1778)

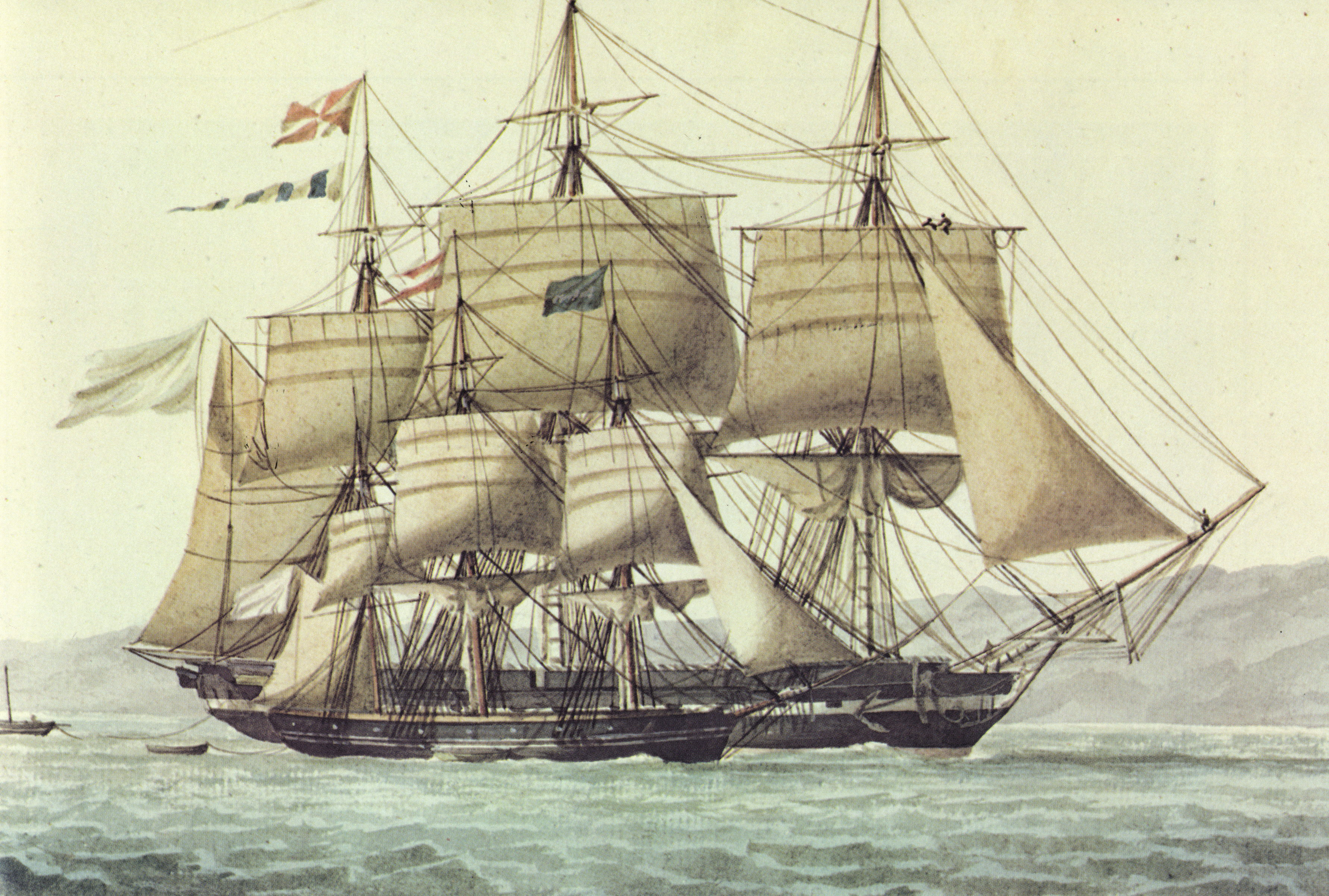
Junon, under Captain Rosamel, capturing a Spanish privateer on 3 March 1823 at 10 in the morning.

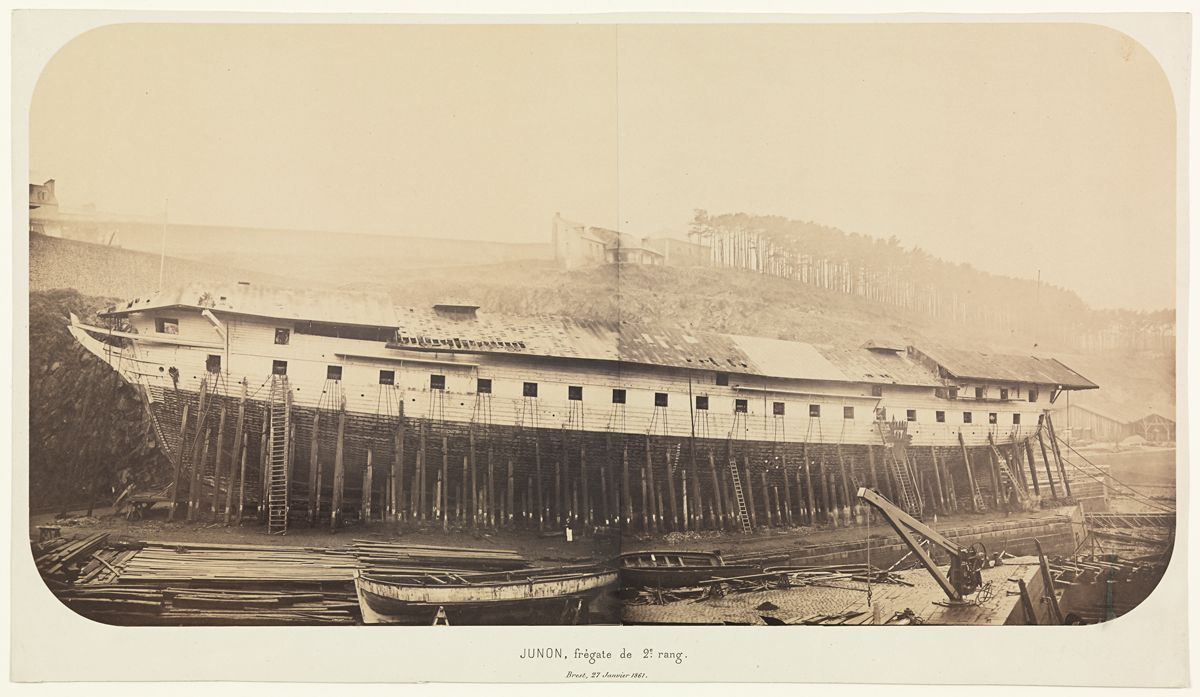
Junon (1861) on stack

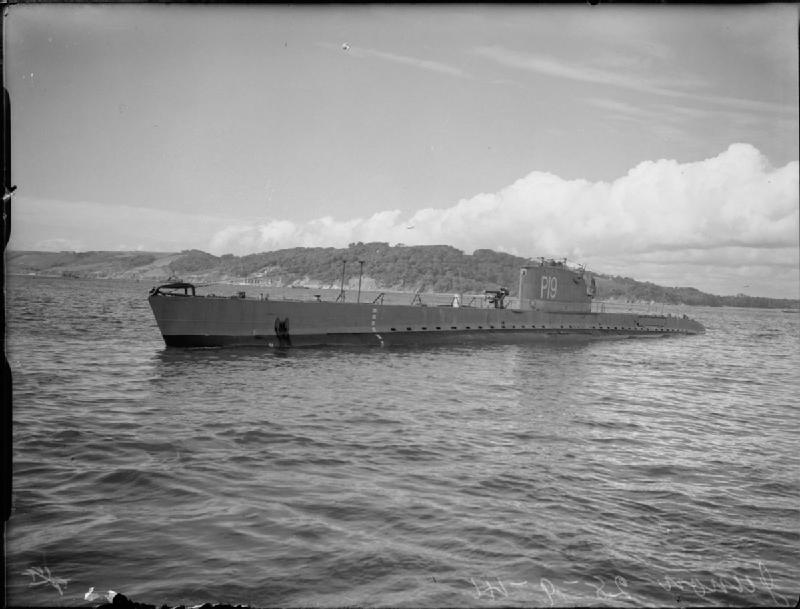
Junon (1935)
