= Frederick Cornewall =

British naval officer (1706–1788)

Captain Frederick Cornewall
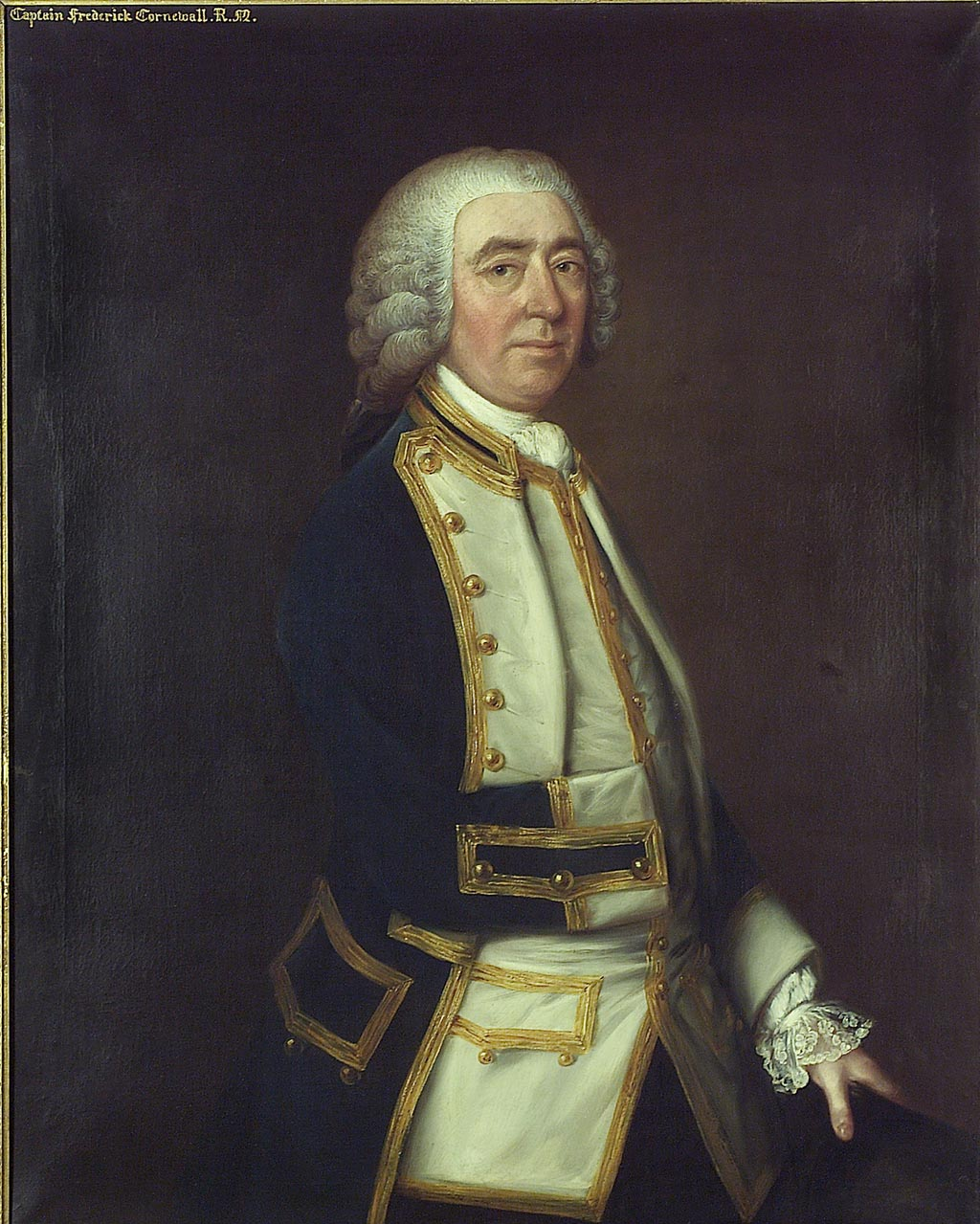
- Frederick Cornewall, by Thomas Gainsborough c. 1762
- Born: 1706; Bromfield, England
- Died: 4 August 1788 (aged 82); Diddlebury, England
- Military career
- Allegiance: Kingdom of Great Britain
- Branch: Royal Navy
- Rank: Captain
- Commands: HMS Colchester; HMS Hector; HMS Sunderland; HMS Revenge; HMS Cornwall
- Conflicts: War of the Austrian Succession; Seven Years' War

Captain Frederick Cornewall (1706 – 4 August 1788) was an officer in the British Royal Navy.

== Early life ==
He was born in 1706, the third son of Rev. Frederick Cornewall (1677-1748), Vicar of Bromfield, Shropshire, and his first wife Elizabeth Trice (d. 1730). He was baptised in his father's church on 3 August 1706.

== Career ==
Following the example of his uncle, Admiral Charles Cornewall, he embarked on a naval career, being promoted to the rank of Lieutenant on 13 March 1734. By February 1744, he was First Lieutenant aboard HMS Marlborough under the command of his cousin James Cornewall. On 11 February 1744, in the Battle of Toulon, Marlborough was immediately astern of Admiral Thomas Mathews' Flagship HMS Namur and the only ship to follow the Admiral into the midst of the Franco-Spanish fleet. Outgunned by the enemy, she came under a heavy bombardment during which James Cornewall was mortally wounded when a Chain-shot carried away both his legs. Frederick took command of the ship, but he too was soon incapacitated when he lost his right arm. When Cornewall was promoted to the rank of Captain soon after, his commission was dated from the date of the battle.

Cornewall's career as an independent commander did not begin auspiciously. Given command of the newly built HMS Colchester in 1744, he was sailing the ship under the guidance of a pilot out of the Nore anchorage and on to the Downs on 21 October when it ran aground between Long Sand and the Kentish Knock. The ship could not be freed, and as her situation worsened the following day, Cornewall ordered her scuttled. It was not until 23 October that a rescue was completed and the Captain and 365 of the crew were taken off. A Lieutenant and 40 men were drowned. The subsequent Court-martial sentenced the pilot to 12 months in the Marshalsea prison.

In February 1745 he was given command of HMS Hector, followed by HMS Sunderland in 1747. In June 1749 he made a generous donation to Thomas Coram's Foundling Hospital, and encouraged the officers and crew of the Sunderland to raise money for the same cause. In May 1755 he was appointed to HMS Revenge, in command of which he took part in the Battle of Minorca. It was Cornewall's evidence to the court-martial that followed that was largely responsible for Admiral John Byng being convicted and executed. Frederick's final command was HMS Cornwall, shortly after it was launched in 1761 and named in honour of his late cousin.

In 1752 he purchased Delbury Hall, near to Diddlebury in Shropshire, from the Bawdewin family.

He was elected to represent Montgomery Boroughs on 15 June 1771, serving until the general election of 1774. He was often away from the House for health reasons, complaining that, "I never am well in the smoke of London".

== Marriage and children ==
He married Mary (1719-1766), the daughter of Francis Herbert MP, at Bromfield on 2 May 1746. The couple had three sons:

- Henry James Cornewall (b. & d. 1747)
- Frederick Cornewall (1752-1783), MP for Leominster and Ludlow.
- Folliott Cornewall (1753-1831), Bishop of Bristol, Hereford and Worcester.

He died at Delbury Hall on 4 August 1788, and is buried at Diddlebury.

Parliament of Great Britain
Preceded by Richard Clive	Member of Parliament for Montgomery Boroughs; 1771–1774	Succeeded by Whitshed Keene
