= William Lloyd (Royal Navy officer) =

Royal Navy Admiral (1725–1796)

Admiral William Lloyd
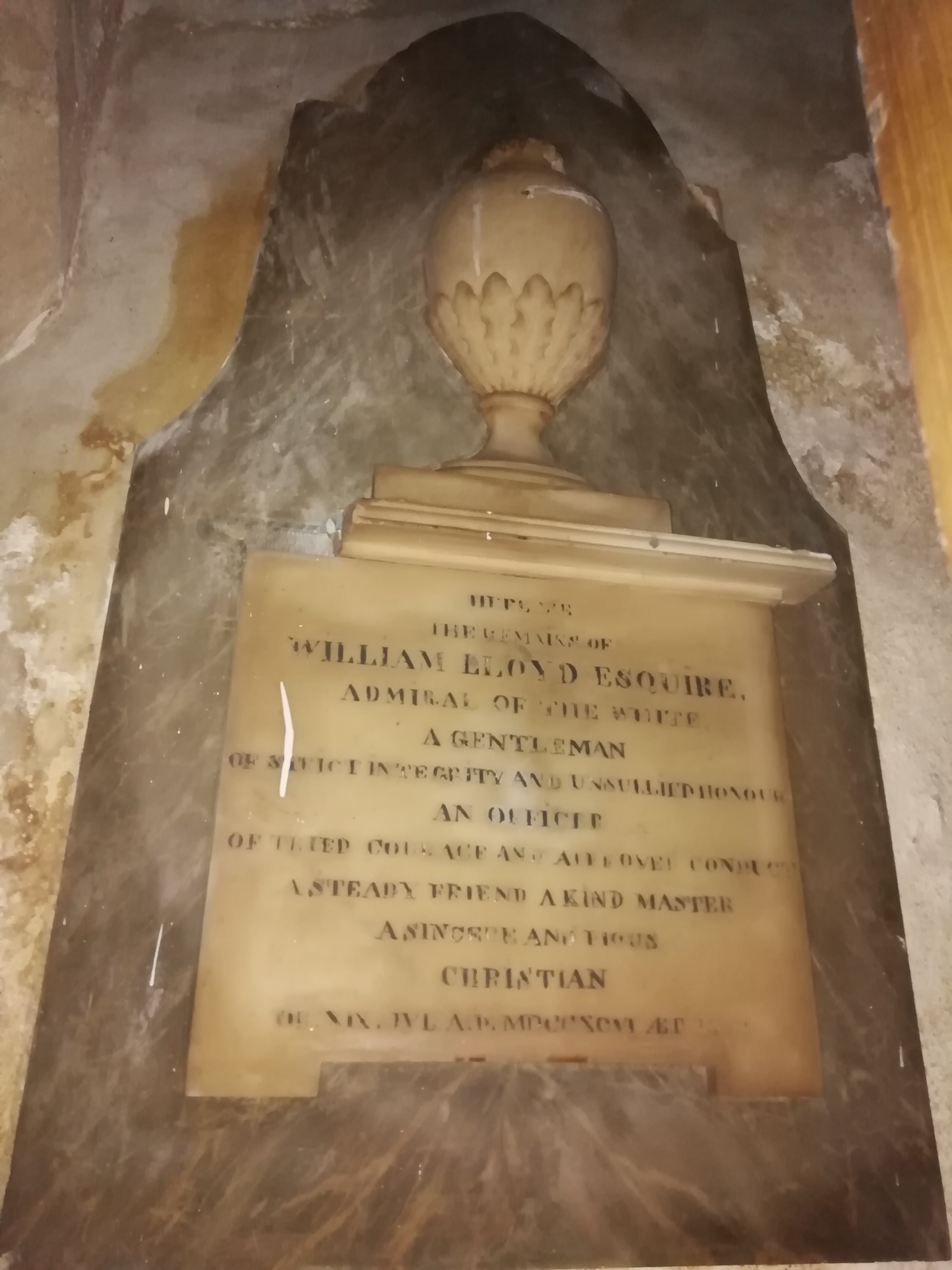
- Memorial to Lloyd, St Cadog's Church, Llangadog
- Born: 28 June 1725; Dan yr allt, Wales
- Died: 19 July 1796 (aged 71); Llangadog, Wales
- Military career
- Allegiance: Great Britain
- Branch: Royal Navy
- Service years: 1740–1796
- Rank: Admiral
- Commands: HMS Otter; HMS Invincible; HMS Sphinx; HMS Chesterfield; HMS Princess Louisa; HMS Conqueror
- Conflicts: Seven Years' War; Battle of Minorca; Action of 5 April 1757; Battle of Lagos

Admiral William Lloyd (28 June 1725 – 19 July 1796) was a Royal Navy officer from Carmarthenshire, Wales, rising to become an Admiral of the White. He sailed Governor Edward Cornwallis aboard HMS Sphinx to establish Halifax, Nova Scotia (1749).

== Naval career ==
Lloyd's first command was of HMS Otter and HMS Invincible, which later sank and is a British heritage site.

During the Seven Years' War, Lloyd commanded HMS Chesterfield at the Battle of Minorca (1756). He also fought in the action of 5 April 1757 in the strait of Gibraltar when he commanded HMS Princess Louisa and the French fleet successfully evaded the British naval forces to arrive at Louisbourg. Finally, he commanded HMS Conqueror at the Battle of Lagos (1759). In the battle, two of his crew were killed and six were wounded. While still under Lloyd's command, the ship sank the following year off Drake's Island.

After the war, Lloyd retired to the family estate in Carmarthenshire. He rose by seniority through the various flag ranks, eventually becoming Admiral of the White on 1 June 1795. He was buried at St Cadog's Church in Llangadog, Wales and a stone monument was mounted on the wall.

== Real estate ==
In 1755, Lloyd was granted the power of attorney to receive rents from his father's estate. In 1761 he was living in Hammersmith, Middlesex and inherited a large number of properties from his parents. He contested the will of his relative Madame Bridget Bevan in 1779.

== Family ==
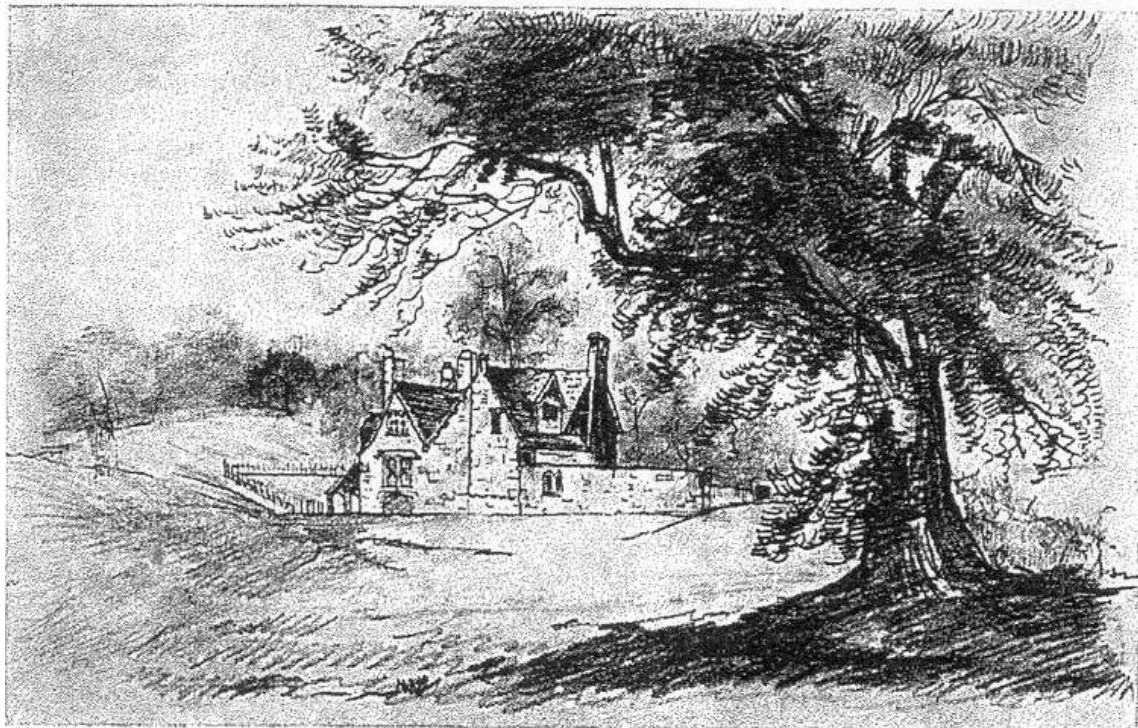
William Lloyd's home - the Dan yr Allt mansion, Wales by H R Lloyd (c.1830)

Lloyd was born in Dan yr allt (formerly Allt y meibion), Llanelli, Carmarthenshire to John Lloyd (1702–1728) and Mary Lloyd. (When John died, Mary re-married Thomas Corbett of St Martin-in-the-Fields, esquire.) William's siblings Vaughan and Rachel are buried in Hammersmith Church. Along with William, neither sibling married or had children. Rachel was a wealthy Housekeeper at Kensington Palace and a pastel artist.

William died in 1796 and was buried in the St. Cadog's church along with his father John and grandfather Thomas, both of whom were High Sheriffs of Carmarthenshire. William's father John created a monument in St. Cadog's church to his parents Thomas (d. 1720) and Rachel Lloyd (d.1702). William's godchild John William Lloyd commissioned another monument in the St. Cadog's church for his son John Philipp Lloyd (d. 1849).

His will is in the National Archives. William divested the Dan y rallt estate to trustees for his kinsman Sir Thomas Stepney, 9th Baronet (d. 1825), the youngest son of Thomas Stepney of Llanelli, 7th baronet. He also left part of his estate to his godchild John William Lloyd.

== Gallery ==
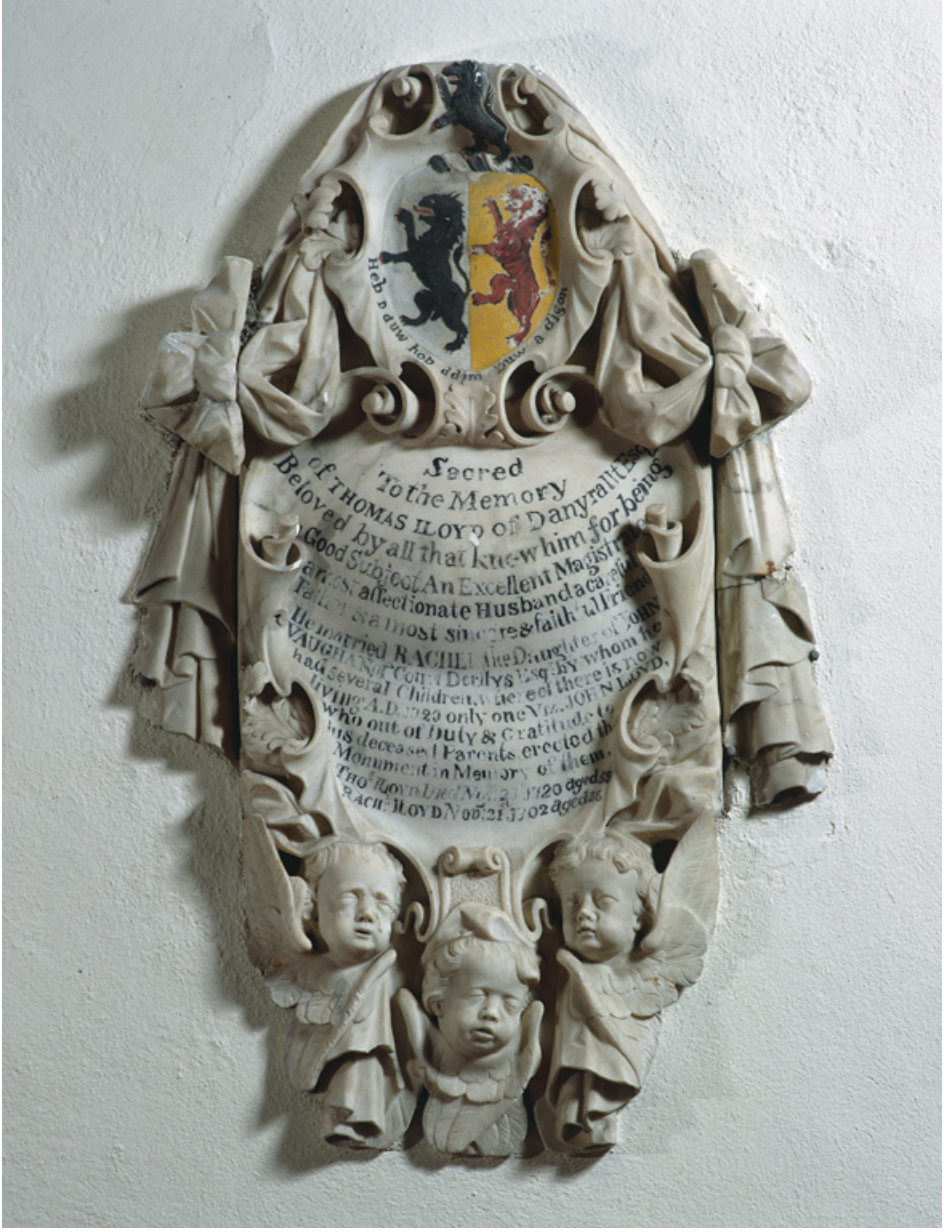
Admiral William Lloyd's grandfather Thomas Lloyd (d.1720), St. Cadog's church, Wales

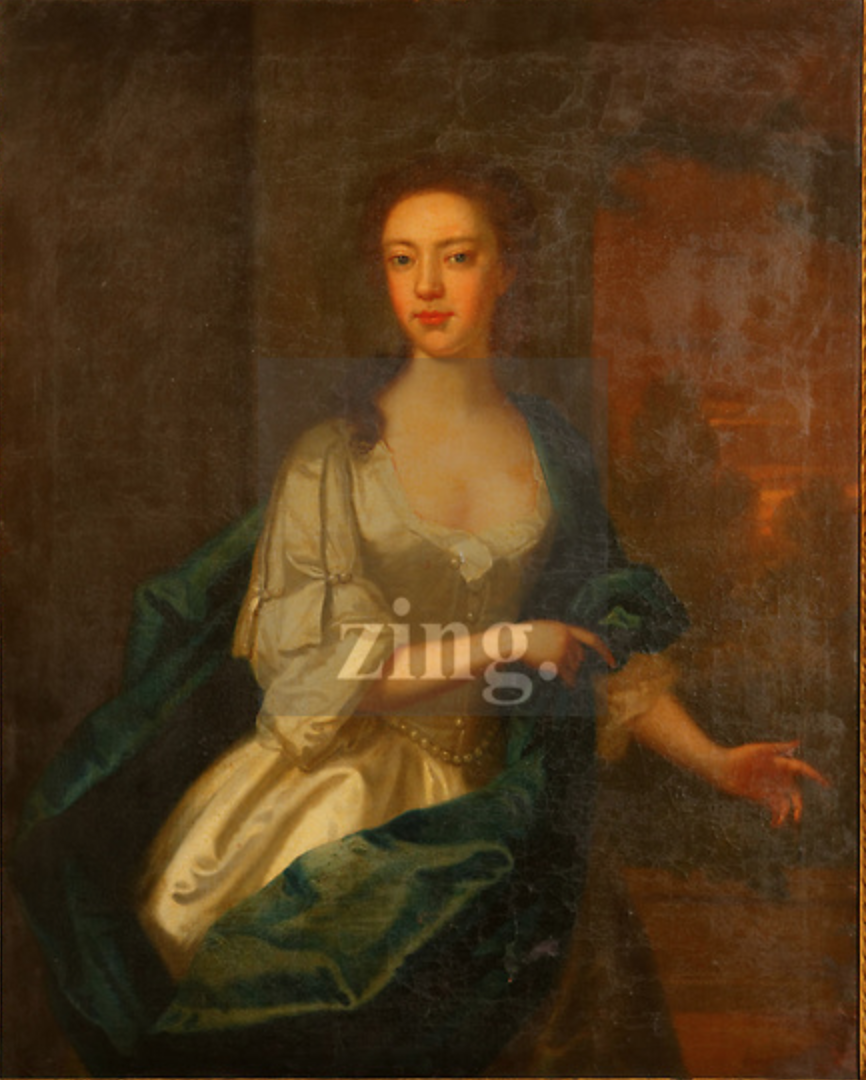
William's sister Rachel Lloyd - the Housekeeper, Kensington Palace.

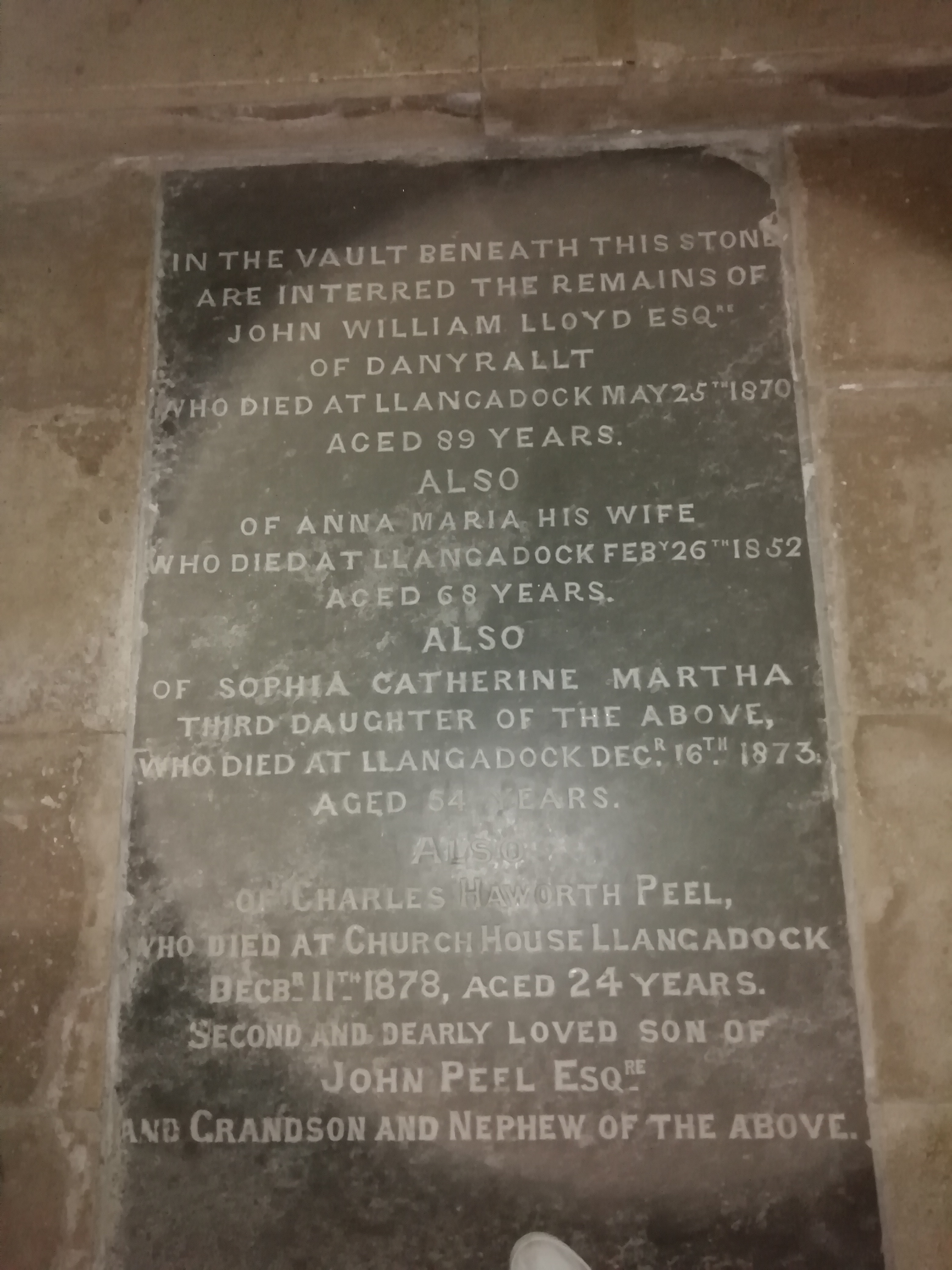
Tomb of Admiral William Lloyd's godchild John William Lloyd, St Cadog's Church in Llangadog, Wales

== See also ==
- List of Royal Navy admirals (1707–current)
