= French ship Couronne (1749) =

Ship of the line of the French Navy

History

France
- Name: Couronne
- Builder: Rochefort
- Laid down: May 1748
- Launched: 1749
- Fate: Condemned in 1766 and broken up

General characteristics
- Displacement: 2760 tonneaux
- Tons burthen: 1360 port tonneaux
- Length: 54.2 m (177 ft 10 in)
- Beam: 14.3 m (46 ft 11 in)
- Draught: 7.1 m (23 ft 4 in)
- Complement: 600
- Armament: 80 guns: 28 × 36-pounder long guns; 30 × 18-pounder long guns; 18 × 8-pounder long guns

Couronne was a 74-gun ship of the line of the French Navy.

She was built at Rochefort, being launched in 1749 and completed the following year. She served until being condemned at Brest and was broken up in 1766. Some of her timbers may have gone towards the construction of her namesake, the 80-gun Saint-Esprit-class Couronne, launched in August that year from Brest.
