= HMS Colchester (1744) =

Ship of the line of the Royal Navy

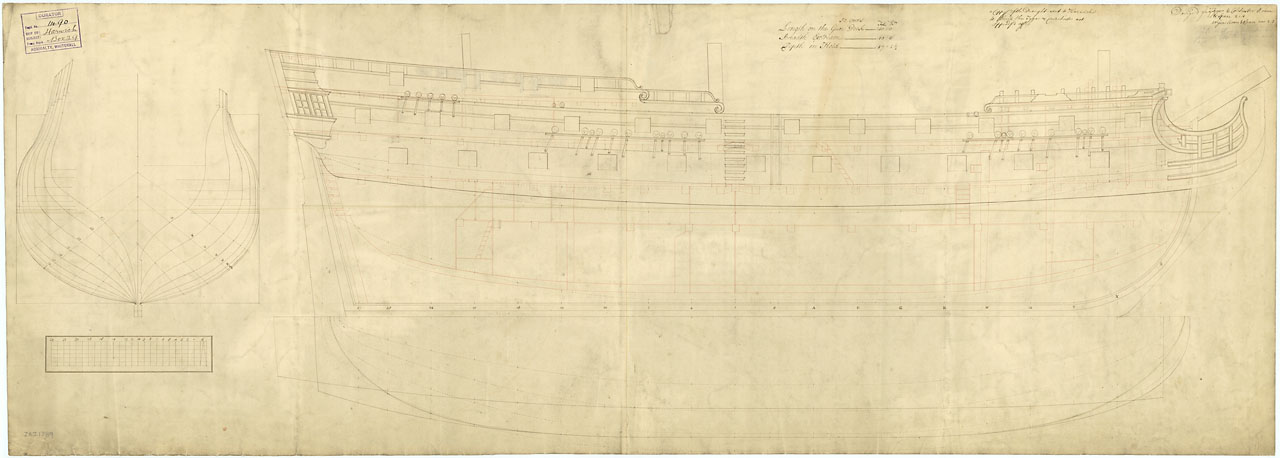
- Colchester

History

Great Britain
- Name: HMS Colchester
- Ordered: 6 September 1742
- Builder: Barnard, Harwich
- Launched: 14 August 1744
- Fate: Wrecked, 21 October 1744

General characteristics
- Class & type: 1741 proposals 50-gun fourth rate ship of the line
- Tons burthen: 976
- Length: 140 ft (42.7 m) (gundeck)
- Beam: 40 ft (12.2 m)
- Depth of hold: 17 ft 2 1/2 in (5.2 m)
- Propulsion: Sails
- Sail plan: Full-rigged ship
- Armament: 50 guns: Gundeck: 22 × 24 pdrs; Upper gundeck: 22 × 12 pdrs; Quarterdeck: 4 × 6 pdrs; Forecastle: 2 × 6 pdrs

HMS Colchester was a 50-gun fourth rate ship of the line of the Royal Navy, built at King's Yard in Harwich by John Barnard according to the dimensions specified in the 1741 proposals of the 1719 Establishment, and launched on 14 August 1744.

== Shipwreck ==
After being commissioned under Captain Frederick Cornewall, Colchester took aboard a pilot to guide the ship out of the Nore anchorage and on to the Downs. Sailing on Sunday 21 October 1744, the ship ran aground between Long Sand and the Kentish Knock, and became stuck in weather that was 'not at all tempestuous.' A boat was sent back to the shore the following morning for help, and whilst the crew waited for it to return, another ship from the Nore arrived to offer assistance, having heard Colchester's cannons being fired in a signal of distress. The would-be rescuer was however kept from the stricken ship by the wind.

In the afternoon of Monday 22 October, the fore and mizzen masts were cut away in an effort to prevent the ship working herself to pieces. This was deemed insufficient, for Captain Cornewall had the ship scuttled. That evening the main mast was also cut away as it was feared the ship might overset. With water now filling the ship, the crew were crammed onto the weather decks and bowsprit; on Tuesday morning lots were drawn to decide who could use the ship's longboat to get to safety. In spite of this, the ship's surgeon and 30 others took the longboat whilst the crew were drawing their lots; the boat subsequently sank, drowning 13. Four others who had jumped for the boat but missed were also drowned.

The boat Colchester had sent away in the morning of 22 October returned with six fishing vessels on 23 October, but they were unable to come to the ship's aid until the following morning when the sea, which had worked up a little overnight, had calmed again. The captain and 365 men were saved; approximately 40 men and one lieutenant were lost in total.

The court-martial for the loss of Colchester was held aboard HMS Royal Sovereign on 14 February 1745. The pilot taken on to guide the ship to the Downs was sentenced to 12 months in the Marshalsea prison.
