= Ottoman raid on the Balearic Islands (1501) =

1501 raid by the Ottoman Empire

An Ottoman raid on the Balearic Islands occurred in 1501 under the Ottoman admiral Kemal Reis. This raid was combined with attacks on Sardinia and Pianosa (near the island of Elba).

The 1501 raid on the Balearics followed some of the earliest interventions of the Ottomans in the western Mediterranean. These interventions were in response to the Fall of Granada and the help the last Muslim ruler there had requested from the Ottoman Empire in his fight against Castile. Upon this request, the Ottoman sultan Bayezid sent a fleet under Kemal Reis to attack the Spanish coast. In 1487 and again in 1492 when Granada fell, the Ottoman fleet was used to rescue refugees and ferry them to the coast of North Africa.

A side effect of the raid seems to have been that a Spanish sailor was captured in possession of an early map of Columbus.

== See also ==
- Barbary slave trade
- Ottoman wars in Europe
- Raid of the Balearic Islands (1558)
