= French ship Junon (1747) =

French Navy warship

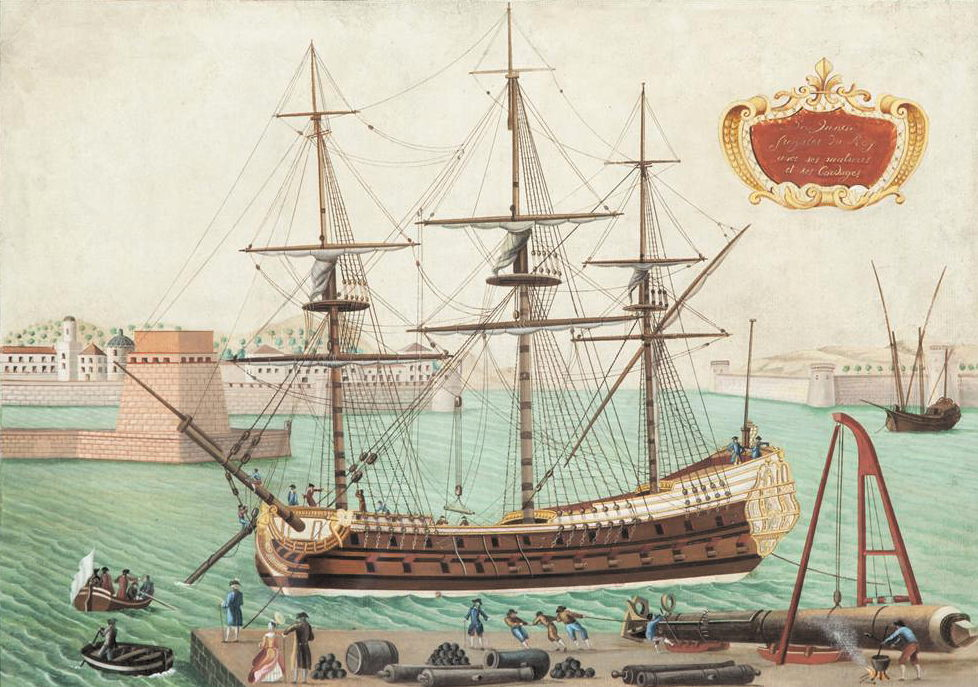
- Painting of Junon

History

France
- Name: Junon
- Builder: Le Havre
- Laid down: January 1747
- Launched: September 1747
- In service: January 1748
- Fate: Ran aground and sold for scrap in December 1757

General characteristics
- Displacement: 1300 tonneaux
- Tons burthen: 780 port tonneaux
- Length: 44.6 m (146 ft 4 in)
- Beam: 12.2 m (40 ft 0 in)
- Draught: 5.7 m (18 ft 8 in)
- Armament: 40 to 44 guns; 24 18-pounder long guns; 24 12-pounder long guns

Junon was a 40-gun two-decker ship-frigate of the French Navy.

== Design ==
Junon was designed by engineer Chaillé, in an attempt to design a ship combining the firepower of a ship of the line with the nautical qualities of a frigate; in effect she was a precursor of the 24-pounder frigates inaugurated in the late 18th century with the French frigate Forte, systemised by the Americans with the heavy Original six frigates of the United States Navy, and perfected in the 19th century with the French two-decker 60-gun frigates of the Surveillante class.

For this purpose, Junon's hull was given a "fish-like" shape, with a wide beam at the bow of the ship, and a tighter aft. The design proved to provide poor sailing qualities: Junon had to be weighted with iron ingots for her stability, and lost six 18-pounders of her lower battery and several guns of her upper gundeck.

== Career ==
In 1752, she departed Toulon for a campaign off Tripoli, under Captain du Revest. In 1756, she took part in the Battle of Minorca under Captain Beaussier de la Chaulame. In January 1757, Junon sustained serious accidental damage in Port Mahon, and was used as a hulk there. In June, she ran aground, and was found to be in such bad shape that she was struck. She was sold for scrap on the spot in December.
