= Raid of the Balearic Islands (1558) =

Battle in Ottoman-Habsburg wars

- Part of the Spanish–Ottoman wars and Italian War of 1551–1559
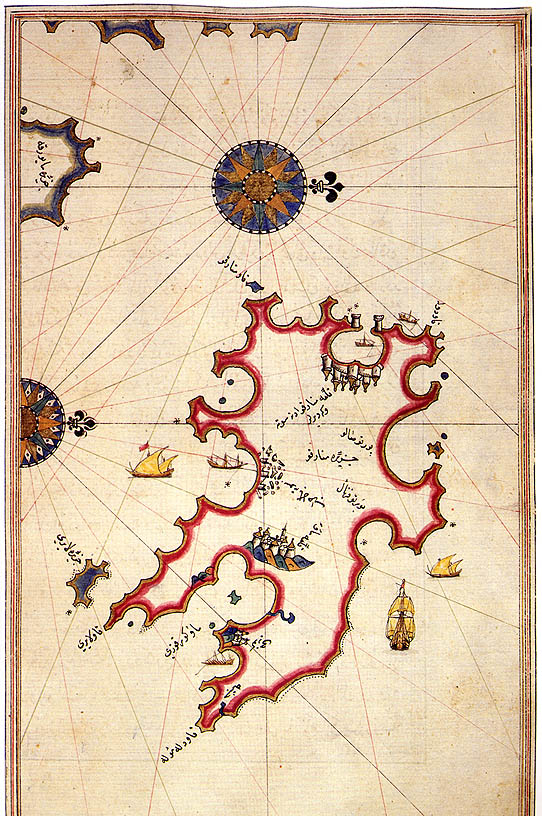
- Historic map of Menorca by Piri Reis
| Date | July 1558 |
| Location | Balearic Islands |
| Result | Ottoman victory |
| Territorial changes | Ottomans temporarily occupy parts of the Balearics |

Belligerents
| Spain | Ottoman Empire |

Commanders and leaders
| Unknown | Piali Pasha; Dragut |

Strength
| 800 men 40–100 soldiers | 150 ships 15,000 men |

Casualties and losses
| 4,000 inhabitants enslaved | Unknown |

The raid of the Balearic Islands was carried out by the Ottoman Empire in 1558, against the Spanish Habsburg territory of the Balearic Islands.

== Background ==
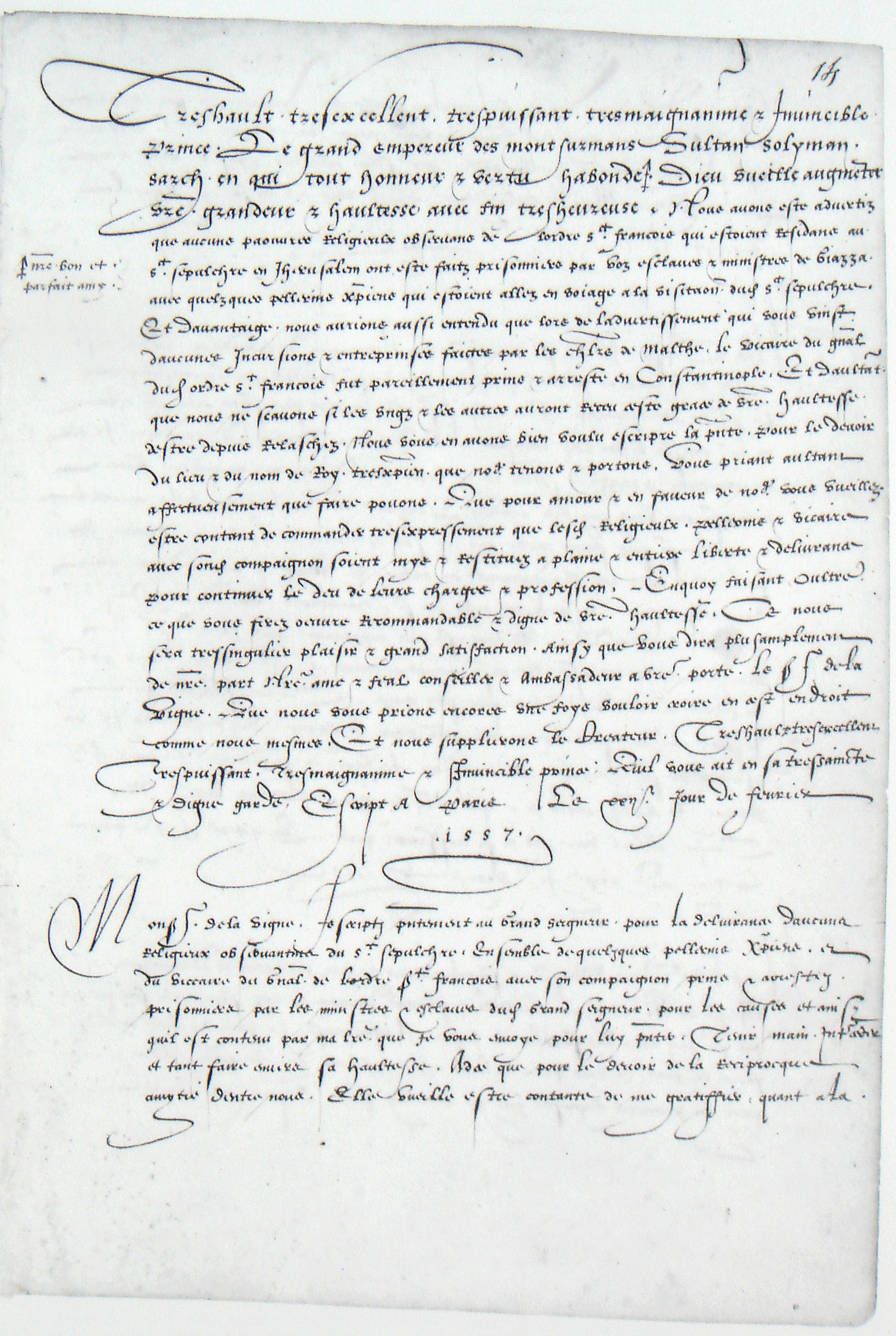
Letter from Henry II of France to Suleiman the Magnificent and ambassador Jean Cavenac de la Vigne, dated 22 February 1557.

The Ottomans had already attacked the Balearic Islands many times previously, as in the 1501 Ottoman raid on the Balearic Islands. Then followed the sacks of Pollença (in 1531 and 1550), the Sack of Mahon in 1535, Alcúdia (1551), Valldemossa (1552), Andratx (1553), and Sóller (1561). Ottoman attacks only decreased after the Battle of Lepanto in 1571, although they continued until the 17th century.

On 30 December 1557, Henry II of France, who was in conflict with the Habsburgs in the Italian War of 1551–1559, wrote a letter to Suleiman, asking him for money, saltpeter, and 150 galleys to be stationed in the West. Through the services of his ambassador Jean Cavenac de la Vigne, Henry II obtained the dispatch of an Ottoman fleet in 1558.

Suleyman the Magnificent sent his fleet as a diversion to help his French allies against the Habsburgs. The Ottoman armada left Constantinople in April 1558. On 13 June 1558 the Ottoman fleet ravaged Italy, with little effect however apart from the sack of Sorrento, then part of the possessions of Spain in southern Italy, where they took 3,000 captives.

== Raid ==
In July, the fleet then started to ravage the Balearic Islands. The Ottoman force consisted of 15,000 soldiers on 150 warships. The Ottomans, after repulsing an attack on Mahón, attacked the citadel of Ciutadella in Menorca, which was only garrisoned with 40 soldiers.

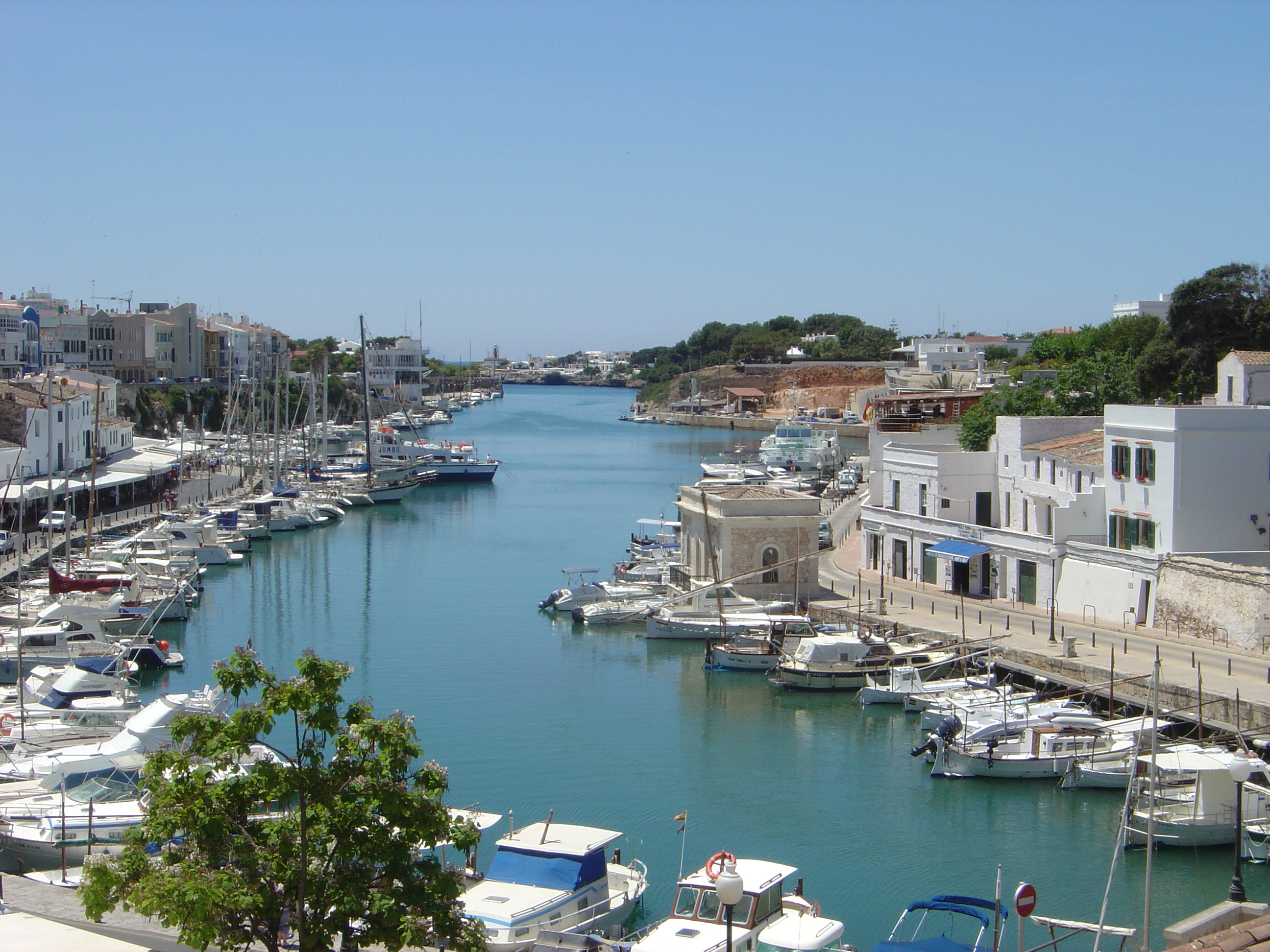
Port of Ciutadella.

On 9 July 1558, the Ottomans under Piyale Pasha and Turgut Reis put the town under siege for eight days, then entered and decimated the town. After the fall of the citadel, the city was ravaged and the population enslaved. All of Ciutadella's 3,099 inhabitants who survived the siege were sold into slavery in the Ottoman Empire, along with people from surrounding villages. In total, 3,452 locals were sold at the slave markets of Constantinople. The Balearic Islands were ravaged, and 4,000 people were taken as prisoners.

An obelisk was set up in the 19th century by Josep Quadrado in the Plaza d'es Born in memory of the offensive, with the following inscription:

Here we fought until death for our religion and our country in the year 1558.

Every year on 9 July a commemoration takes place in Ciutadella, remembering "l’Any de sa Desgràcia", or "the Year of the Disaster".

== Aftermath ==
As a later consequence of the 1553 Franco-Ottoman Invasion of Corsica, the same Ottoman fleet was delayed from joining a French fleet in Corsica near Bastia, possibly due to the failure of the commander Dragut to honour Suleiman's orders. Suleiman apologized in a letter to Henry at the end of 1558.

== See also ==
- Barbary pirates
- Barbary slave trade
- Ottoman wars in Europe
- Franco-Ottoman alliance
