= Sack of Mahón =

1535 siege and sack

Coordinates: 39.8892°N 4.2636°E

- Part of Ottoman wars in Europe and Spanish–Ottoman wars
Date	September 1, 1535
Location	Mahón, Balearic Islands
Result	Barbarossa sacks Mahón

Belligerents
Spanish Empire	Ottoman Empire

Commanders and leaders
Unknown	Hayreddin Barbarossa

Strength
350	2,500; 22 galleys 9 galiots

Casualties and losses
600–800 enslaved	None

The sack of Mahón occurred in 1535, when Hayreddin Barbarossa attacked the harbour of Mahón in the Balearic Islands.

The expedition followed closely the defeat of Barbarossa in the Conquest of Tunis by Charles V. Barbarossa had escaped Tunis and boarded his fleet in Bône.

Mahón had no garrison, only one or two cannons and no ammunition or gunpowder stored. It had only 300 arms and about 1,500 inhabitants, of which only 350 were fit for military service. The capital of the island at the time was Ciutadella, which housed the garrison. Barbarossa took considerable booty and as many as 600-800 slaves whom he brought back to Algiers.

== Attack ==
On the night of September 1, 1535, the navy of the Ottoman Empire entered the port of Mahón camouflaged as imperial ships returning from the conquest of Tunis. The Franciscan friars Bartomeu Genestar and Francesc Coll went to receive the boats, believing they were imperial ships. Upon realizing that it was the Turks who were coming again, they gave notice to the population, which closed the city walls and began to prepare for battle.

Seeing Barbarossa disembark his 2,500 men and begin to besiege the town, the population sent a warning of the danger to the governor in Ciutadella (the capital of Menorca at the time), who immediately gathered the knights and formed a relief column which headed quickly towards Mahón, recruiting additional reinforcements along the way. On September 3, the column of 300 men came into contact with the Ottoman troops, who, far superior in number, annihilated it, killing the governor and 100 of his knights.

The failure of the relief column undermined the morale of the besieged population, and when the wall was partially destroyed, the leaders of Mahón contacted Barbarossa to discuss the terms of surrender. On the evening of September 4, they agreed to a surrender of the city, on the condition that in the plundering of the city the leaders and their houses would be respected. The following night was hellish for Mahón, with the death of the Franciscans and other civilians in addition to rapes, fires, depredations, and the capture of 600 prisoners who were never heard from again. Meanwhile, the leaders of the city took refuge in Binimaimut.

== Consequences ==
The leaders who had surrendered the city were captured on September 8 by order of Eiximèn Perez de Figuerola, Viceroy of Mallorca. On the same day, the trial began, which lasted more than a year, and on October 24, 1536 the five main defendants were executed in the Plaça del Born in Ciutadella.

The attack led to the construction of St. Philip's Castle starting in 1554, with a new garrison of professional soldiers, in addition to a defense tower on the pier of Palma. In the following century, the area around the defensive tower was expanded with the construction of the La Avanzada fortress.
