= HMS Princess Louisa (1744) =

Ship of the line of the Royal Navy

History

Great Britain
- Name: HMS Princess Louisa
- Ordered: 23 December 1742
- Builder: Carter, Limehouse
- Launched: 1 July 1744
- Honours and awards: Second Battle of Cape Finisterre, 1747:
- Fate: Broken up, 1766

General characteristics
- Class & type: 1741 proposals 58-gun fourth rate ship of the line
- Length: 147 ft (44.8 m) (gundeck)
- Beam: 42 ft (12.8 m)
- Depth of hold: 18 ft 1 in (5.5 m)
- Propulsion: Sails
- Sail plan: Full-rigged ship
- Armament: 58 guns: Gundeck: 24 × 24 pdrs; Upper gundeck: 24 × 12 pdrs; Quarterdeck: 8 × 6 pdrs; Forecastle: 2 × 6 pdrs

HMS Princess Louisa was a 58-gun fourth rate ship of the line of the Royal Navy, built to the dimensions prescribed in the 1741 proposals of the 1719 Establishment at Limehouse, and launched on 1 July 1744.

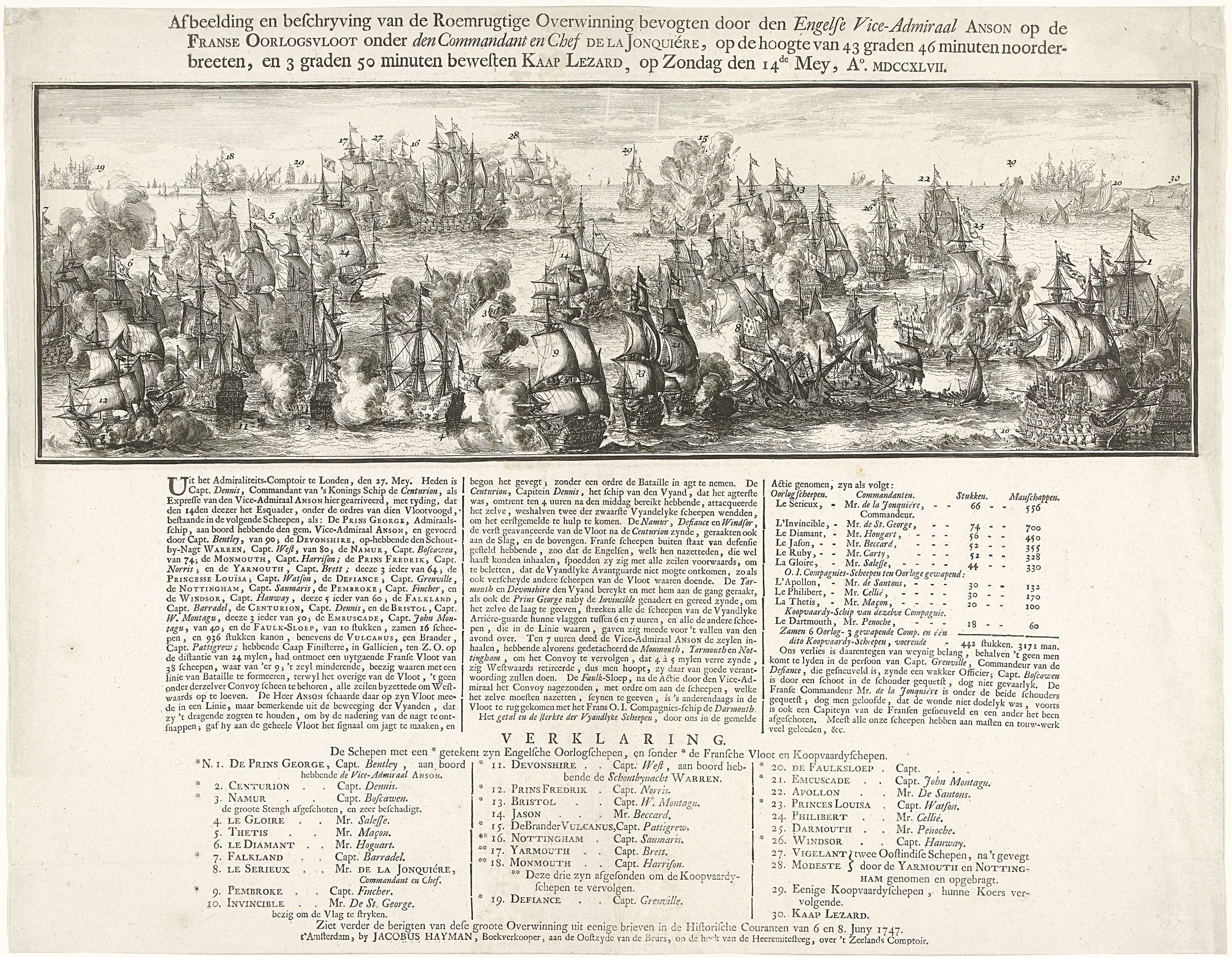
The Princess Louisa shown here at the First Battle of Cape Finisterre (1747)

The ship was under the command of William Lloyd in the Louisbourg Expedition (1757).

Princess Louisa served until 1766, when she was broken up.
