= HMS Bentley =

Frigate of the Royal Navy

History

United Kingdom
- Builder: Bethlehem Hingham Shipyard
- Laid down: 26 April 1943
- Launched: 17 July 1943
- Commissioned: 13 October 1943
- Decommissioned: Returned to US Navy on 5 November 1945
- Fate: Sold on 17 June 1947 for scrapping

General characteristics
- Class & type: Captain-class frigate
- Displacement: 1,800 long tons (1,829 t) fully loaded
- Length: 306 ft (93 m) overall
- Beam: 36.5 ft (11.1 m)
- Draught: 11 ft (3.4 m) fully loaded
- Speed: 24 knots (44 km/h)
- Endurance: 5,500 nautical miles (10,200 km) at 15 knots (28 km/h)
- Complement: Typically between 170 & 180

HMS Bentley was a Captain-class frigate which served during World War II. The ship was named after Sir John Bentley who entered the Royal Navy in 1720. Between 1744 and 1761 he commanded a series of ships and took part in the decisive victory at the Battle of Quiberon Bay in 1759 while commanding a 74-gun third-rate ship of the line HMS Warspite.

Originally destined for the US Navy as a turbo-electric (TE) type Buckley-class destroyer escort, HMS Bentley was provisionally given the name USS Ebert (later this name was reassigned to DE 768) however the delivery was diverted to the Royal Navy before the launch.

== Construction and design ==
The Buckley class was one of six classes of destroyer escorts built for the US Navy to meet the massive demand for escort vessels following America's entry into World War Two. While basically similar, the different classes were fitted with different propulsion gear and armament. The Buckleys had a turbo-electric drive, and a main gun armament of 3-inch guns.

The Buckley- (or TE) class ships were 306 feet (93.27 m) long overall and 300 feet (91.44 m) between perpendiculars, with a beam of 37 feet (11.28 m) and a mean draught of 11 feet 3 inches (3.43 m). Displacement was 1,430 long tons (1,450 t) standard and 1,823 long tons (1,852 t) full load. Two boilers fed steam to steam turbines which drove electrical generators, with in turn powered electric motors that propelled the ship. The machinery was rated at 12,000 shaft horsepower (8,900 kW), giving a speed of 23 knots (26 mph; 43 km/h). 359 long tons (365 t) of oil was carried, giving a range of 6,000 nautical miles (6,900 mi; 11,000 km) at 12 knots (14 mph; 22 km/h).

The ship's main gun armament consisted of three 3-inch (76 mm) 50 caliber dual-purpose (i.e. anti-surface and anti-aircraft) guns, two forward and one aft, in open mounts. Close in armament consisted of two 40 mm Bofors guns, backed up by eight single Oerlikon 20 mm cannon. A triple mount of 21-inch (533 mm) torpedo tubes provided a capability against larger ships, while anti-submarine armament consisted of a Hedgehog forward-firing anti-submarine mortar and four depth charge throwers and two depth charge rails. Crew was 200 officers and other ranks.

DE 74 was laid down at Bethlehem Shipbuilding Corporation's Hingham Shipyard, in Hingham, Massachusetts on 26 April 1943. She was originally planned to serve with the US Navy with the name Ebert, but was allocated to Great Britain under the Lend Lease programme on 10 July 1943. The ship was launched as HMS Bentley (Note: Bentley was named after Sir John Bentley who was Admiral Anson's Flag captain at the First Battle of Cape Finisterre in 1747 and commanded HMS Warspite at the Battle of Lagos and the Battle of Quiberon Bay in 1759.) (Note: The name Ebert was re-allocated to DE-768.) on 17 July 1943 and commissioned in the Royal Navy, with the pennant number K465, on 13 October 1943.

== Service ==
HMS Bentley served exclusively with the 1st Escort Group taking part in operations in the North Atlantic.

On 18 February 1944, the German submarine U-859 torpedoed and sunk the Panamanian merchant ship Colin in the North Atlantic. The next day, Bentley and sister ship Affleck rescued the 54 survivors from Colin. In June 1944, the Allies invaded Normandy, and the 1st Escort Group, including Bentley, was one of six Escort Groups deployed to form a barrier about 130 miles west of Lands End to prevent German U-boats based in the French Atlantic ports from interfering with the landings. In December 1944, Bentley remained part of the 1st Escort Group, based at Belfast and operating at the western end of the Channel. By March–April 1945, the 1st Escort Group, still including Bentley was operating out of Portsmouth against German submarines in the Channel.

== Disposal ==
Following the end of the war, ships supplied to the Royal Navy under Lend Lease were soon returned to the United States, with Bentley being returned to United States Navy control on 5 November 1945. The ship was stricken from the US Naval Vessel Register on 15 December 1945 and sold for scrap to John J. Witte of Staten Island on 17 July 1947.

== Bibliography ==
- Blair, Clay (2000). Hitler's U-Boat War: The Hunted, 1942–1945. New York: Modern Library. ISBN 0-679-64033-9.
- Collingwood, Donald (1998). The Captain Class Frigates in the Second World War. Barnsley, UK: Leo Cooper. ISBN 0-85052-615-9.
- Elliott, Peter (1977). Allied Escort Ships of World War II: A complete survey. London: Macdonald and Jane's. ISBN 0-356-08401-9.
- Franklin, Bruce Hampton (1999). The Buckley-Class Destroyer Escorts. London: Chatham Publishing. ISBN 1-86176-118-X.
- Friedman, Norman (1982). U.S. Destroyers: An Illustrated Design History. Annapolis, Maryland, USA: Naval Institute Press. ISBN 0-87021-733-X.
- Manning, T. D.; Walker, C. F. (1959). British Warship Names. London: Putnam.
- Rohwer, Jürgen; Hümmelchen, Gerhard (1992). Chronology of the War at Sea 1939–1945. London: Greenhill Books. ISBN 1-85367-117-7.
- Whitley, M. J. (2000). Destroyers of World War Two: An International Encyclopedia. London: Cassell & Co. ISBN 1-85409-521-8.
