= Louis-Armand-Constantin de Rohan =

French Navy officer and colonial administrator (1732–1794)

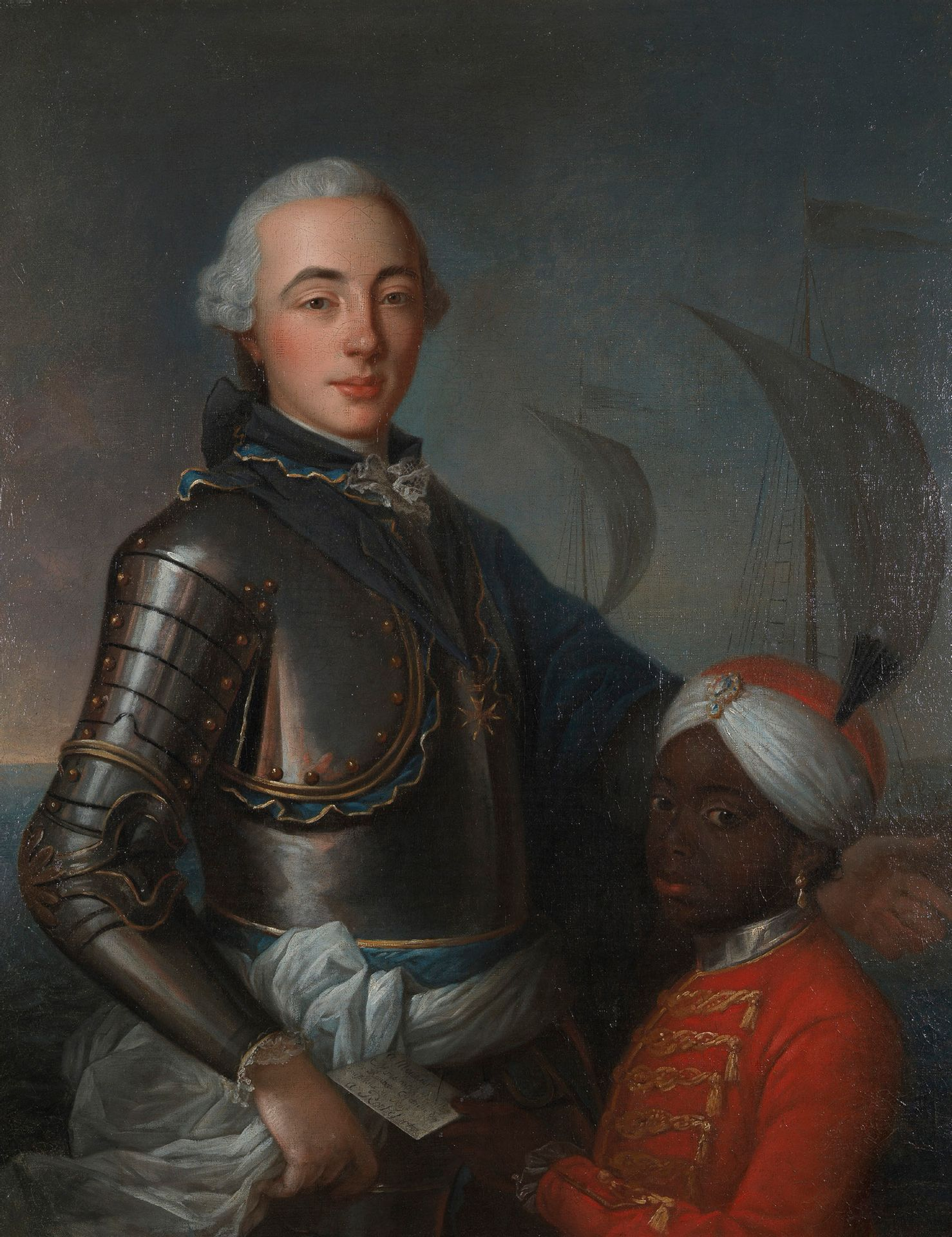
- 1758 portrait of Rohan and his slave Roch Aza

Governor of Saint-Domingue
- In office 1 July 1766 – 10 February 1769
- Preceded by: Charles Henri Hector d'Estaing
- Succeeded by: Pierre Gédéon de Nolivos

Personal details
- Born: 6 April 1732 Paris, France
- Died: 27 July 1794 (aged 62) Paris, France
- Occupation: Naval officer

Military service
- Allegiance: France
- Branch/service: French Navy
- Years of service: 1758–1789
- Rank: Lieutenant général des armées navales
- Commands: Raisonnable; Levant Fleet
- Battles/wars: Seven Years' War; Action of 29 April 1758 (surrendered); American Revolutionary War

Lieutenant général des armées navales Louis-Armand-Constantin de Rohan (6 April 1732 – 27 July 1794) was a French Navy officer and colonial administrator who served as the governor of Saint-Domingue from 1766 to 1769.

== Life ==
Louis-Armand-Constantin de Rohan was born in Paris on 6 April 1732. He was the fifth of seven children of Hercule Mériadec, Prince of Guéméné and Louise Gabrielle Julie de Rohan, the daughter of Hercule Mériadec, Duke of Rohan-Rohan, head of the cadet branch of the House of Rohan. The House of Rohan, of which Rohan was a member of the senior branch, was a powerful French family which claimed descent from the sovereign Dukes of Brittany, in right of which it held the rank of prince étranger at the French court.

Rohan joined the French Navy in 1758 during the Seven Years' War and was promoted to ship-of-the-line captain and placed in command of Raisonnable. At the action of 29 April 1758 his ship was captured in the Bay of Biscay by HMS Dorsetshire . Rohan was eventually exchanged and in 1764 he was promoted to chef d'escadre and on 1 July 1766 appointed as the governor of Saint-Domingue. In 1768 Rohan suppressed a revolt by French colonists in Saint-Domingue before being replaced as governor on 10 February 1769. Rohan was promoted to lieutenant général des armées navales in 1770 and in the following year married Louise Rosalie Le Tonnelier de Breteuil, the daughter of François Victor Le Tonnelier de Breteuil.

During the American Revolutionary War Rohan was promoted to lieutenant général des armées navales in the Levant Fleet, which was based at Toulon, but his actions as governor of Saint-Domingue attracted controversy and he was repeatedly refused overseas postings. Following the beginning of the French Revolution in 1789, towards which Rohan was openly hostile, he left the French navy. In 1794 after refusing to prove his allegiance to the First French Republic Rohan was condemned by a Revolutionary Tribunal and executed in Paris by guillotine on 27 July.
