= HMS Intrepid (1747) =

Royal Navy ship

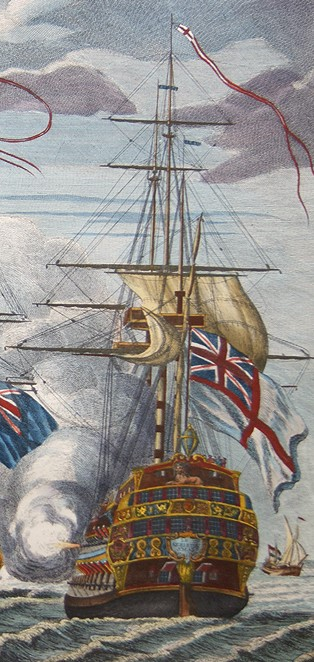
- Stern view of Intrepid

History

France
- Name: Sérieux
- Ordered: 6 February 1738
- Builder: René Boyer & Pierre-Blaise Coulomb, Toulon
- Laid down: 4 October 1738
- Launched: 26 October 1740
- Commissioned: May 1741
- Captured: 14 May 1747, by Royal Navy

Great Britain
- Name: Intrepid
- Acquired: 14 May 1747
- Fate: Broken up, 2 August 1765

General characteristics
- Class & type: 64-gun third rate ship of the line
- Tons burthen: 1,286 bm
- Length: 47.10 m (154 ft 6 in) (gundeck); 42.23 m (138 ft 7 in) (keel)
- Beam: 12.99 m (42 ft 7 in)
- Draught: 6.50 / 6.74 m (21 ft 4 in / 22 ft 1 in)
- Depth of hold: 6.28 m (20 ft 7 in)
- Propulsion: Sails
- Complement: 460
- Armament: 64 guns: Lower gun deck: 26 x 24 pdrs; Upper gun deck: 28 x 12 pdrs; Quarterdeck: 6 x 6 pdrs; Forecastle: 4 x 12 pdrs

HMS Intrepid was a 64-gun third rate ship of the line of the Royal Navy, originally built in Toulon for the French Navy. She was launched in 1740, as Sérieux and fought at the Battle of Toulon before her capture by the British at the First Battle of Cape Finisterre in 1747. After being renamed and refitted by the Royal Navy, she entered British service in late 1747. Between 1748 and 1752 she was assigned as a guard ship off the coast of Kent in south-east England.

In 1756 she joined the Mediterranean fleet and was heavily damaged at the Battle of Minorca, one of the first naval battles of the Seven Years' War, where she suffered 45 casualties. After undergoing repairs and a further refit, during which she was reduced to a 60-gun fourth rate ship of the line, Intrepid rejoined the Seven Years' War, taking part in the Battle of Lagos and the Battle of Quiberon Bay in 1759. She crossed the Atlantic in 1761, and fought in the West Indies Campaign of the War, featuring in the Siege of Havana the following year. She was broken up at Chatham in 1765.

== Design and description ==
During the first 25 years of Louis XV's reign, beginning in 1715, France built relatively few ships. A sustained period of peace led to low funding for the French Navy, and those ships that were built were designed to be cost effective; maximising their manoeuvrability and armament in order to be able to stand up to the British Royal Navy, which had more ships. As a result, most French third rate ships of the line were built from a formulaic design with 60 or 64 guns dating back to the 1660s. The design was updated slightly in the 1730s to allow an extra pair of guns on each gun deck, but otherwise remained constant. It was to this standard that René Boyer based his design for Sérieux in the late 1730s, though Boyer died before the ship could be completed, and it was finished under the supervision of Pierre-Blaise Coulomb.

Sérieux measured 47.10 metres (154 ft 6 in) long at the gun deck and 42.23 metres (138 ft 7 in) long at the keel. She had a beam of 12.99 metres (42 ft 7 in), a draught of 6.50 / 6.74 m (21 ft 4 in / 22 ft 1 in), and a depth of hold of 6.28 metres (20 ft 7 in), and a tonnage of 1,286 bm as designed. She was initially carried a crew of 400 men during wartime and 340 at peace, commanded by six officers, but the complement later rose to 460 and 410 during war and peacetime, respectively. Sérieux was armed with 64 guns, consisting of twenty-six 24-pounders on the lower gun deck, twenty-eight 12-pounders on the upper gun deck, six 6-pounders on the quarterdeck and four 12-pounders on the forecastle.

== Service ==
=== French Navy ===
Sérieux was ordered on 6 February 1738, laid down in Toulon on 4 October 1738, and launched just over two years later, on 26 October 1740. She was completed in May 1741. On 19 February 1744, under the command of Alexandre de Cheylus, she sailed out of Toulon as part of a French fleet which was tasked with escorting trapped Spanish ships past the British blockade of Toulon, leading to the Battle of Toulon. The British and French were not at war, so the French fleet was under orders not to attack the British, but to retaliate if attacked. The Franco-Spanish fleet established a line of battle, with three distinct sections: forward, centre and vanguard. Sérieux formed part of the central group, which combined both French and Spanish ships. When the British attacked, HMS Berwick should have engaged Sérieux, but was too far back, and became embroiled with the Spanish ships behind instead, while Sérieux was able to fire upon her lee side bow. Sérieux also exchanged fire with Princess Caroline and one of the British flagships, Barfleur. Although the battle was indecisive, the Franco-Spanish fleet was able to escape and deliver troops to Italy to shift the balance of the war.

In early May 1747, a pair of French convoys left Rochefort; one intended for India, and the other for North America. A French naval fleet under the command of Jacques-Pierre de Taffanel de la Jonquière, on board Sérieux as his flagship and Jacques-François Grout de Saint-Georges on Invincible provided an escort. A British fleet led by Admiral George Anson sailed to intercept the convoy, and after patrolling the Bay of Biscay, encountered the French fleet on 14 May, 25 miles (40 km) north-west of Cape Finisterre in Spain. De la Jonquière ordered his fleet into a line of battle, but they were significantly outnumbered by the British, and after three hours, the entire French naval fleet, including Sérieux, was captured.

=== Royal Navy ===
After her capture on 14 May 1747, (Note: In the Julian calendar then in use in Britain this was 3 May 1747.) Sérieux was sailed to Portsmouth where she was surveyed just over two weeks later, and subsequently purchased by the Board of Admiralty on 19 August for £8 5s per ton. Two days later, she was renamed HMS Intrepid. She underwent refit between from August until the following March at a cost of over £10,000, and was commissioned in November 1747 under the command of Captain William Parry. A year later, she was placed on guard duties, doing so in Kent, at Chatham from 1749 to 1751, and Sheerness in 1752, before being decommissioned in November that year. After a survey in July 1753 required no repairs, she was eventually recommissioned in September 1755, commanded by Captain James Young.

In April 1756, during the prelude to what later became known as the Seven Years' War, the Intrepid left Britain as part of a fleet sailing to the Mediterranean under the command of Admiral John Byng. The French had been menacing British-held Minorca for some time, and on 18 April a large French fleet had established itself off the north-west of the island. They bombarded the island, until Byng's fleet arrived on 19 May. The two fleets were relatively equally matched; the British had 842 guns to the French fleet's 800, and each had around a dozen ships of the line. The next day, at the Battle of Minorca, the fleets met in a wedge; rather than match-up side by side, the British fleet intercepted the French at an angle of around 30 to 40 degrees, meaning that while the ships at the front were engaged, those at the rear were too far from the French to fight. Intrepid, the sixth British ship from the front, was immobilised early in the fighting when her fore-topmast was hit by enemy fire and destroyed. This caused her to fall back out of the line of battle. Byng instructed the 44-gun frigate HMS Chesterfield to lay by Intrepid while the rest of the fleet continued. Ultimately, Byng and his council of war called off the attack, and Minorca fell to the French soon after. During the battle, along with the damage suffered, Intrepid suffered 45 casualties; 9 killed and 36 wounded.

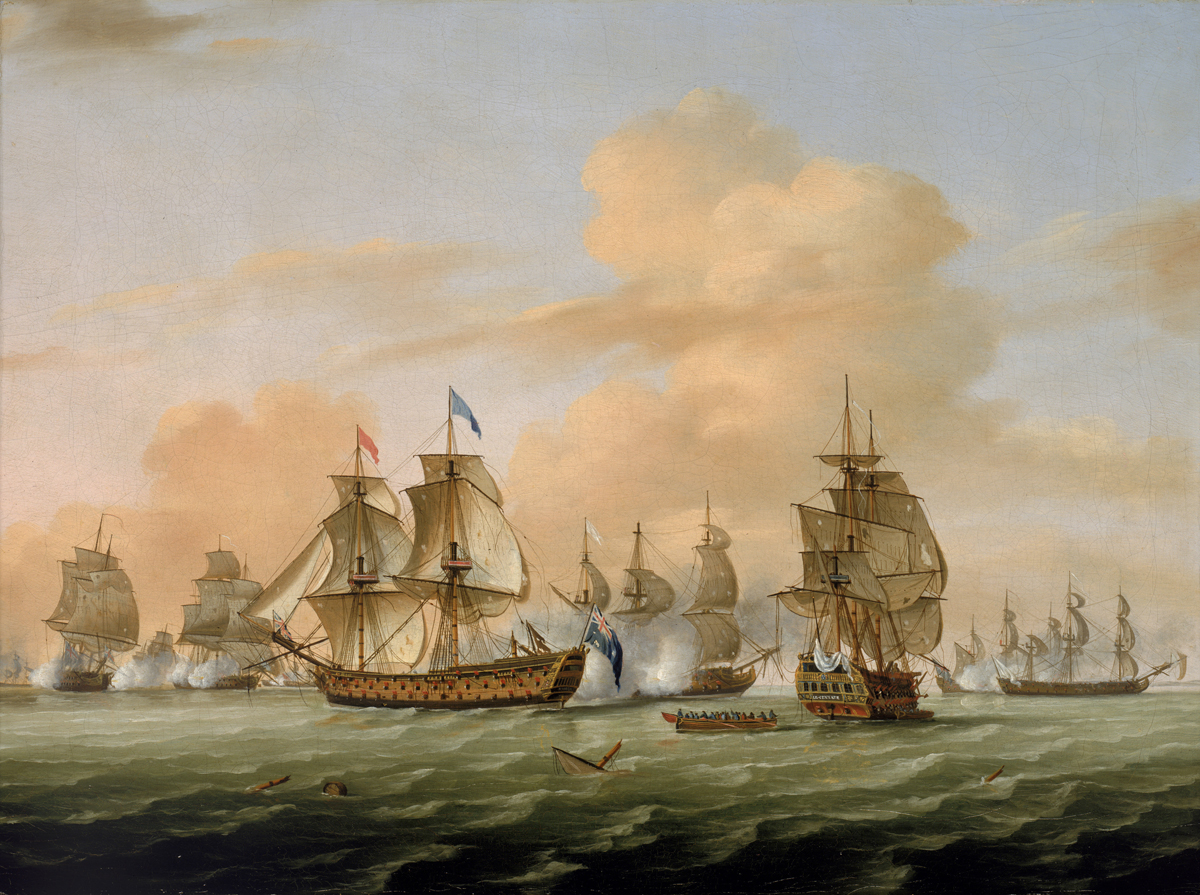
Intrepid was part of a large British fleet which defeated the French at the Battle of Lagos in 1759.

Four months of refits and repairs during 1757 cost £8,842, during which she was reduced to a 60-gun fourth rate ship. Under the command of Captain Edward Pratten, she was recommissioned in June 1757, and sailed with Hawke's fleet until switching to Anson's the following summer. She was involved with the blockade of Brest in April 1758, where Pratten had command of a small squadron. The crew of the Intrepid spotted a French ship, Raisonnable, and Pratten sent two of his ships to chase her. The British ships successfully captured Raisonnable, which was subsequently commissioned into the Royal Navy. The following year, she was involved in the Battle of Lagos; a British victory over the a French fleet attempting to escape the Mediterranean. Intrepid was one of fifteen British ships of the line which helped Admiral Edward Boscawen capture three enemy vessels and destroy two others. Towards the end of the battle, Boscawen's main aim was to secure the French commander, and so he ordered Intrepid, along with America to seize the enemy flagship, Océan. As Intrepid had already anchored, she was unable to carry out the orders, which America completed alone, destroying the French flagship and capturing its surviving crew. Intrepid lost six men during the battle, while a further ten were wounded. She returned to England with Boscawen's fleet.

Two years later, Captain Jervis Maplesden commanded her at the Battle of Quiberon Bay, a decisive naval victory over the French, after which she blockaded the Basque Roads. She crossed the Atlantic to North America in August 1761, and took part in the Havana operations, under the command of Captain John Hale, from June to August 1762, before being decommissioned in 1763. After surveys in May 1764 and June 1765, she was broken up at Chatham from June until August 1765 for £644 10s 2d.

== Bibliography ==
- Black, Jeremy (1994). European Warfare, 1660–1815. London: UCL Press. ISBN 0-203-49942-5.
- Clowes, William Laird (1903). The Royal Navy, A History from the Earliest Times to Present. London: S. Low, Marston, Co. OCLC 1084577790.
- d'Agay, Frédéric (2011). La Provence au service du roi (1637–1831) (in French). Paris: Honoré Champion. ISBN 9782745321107. OCLC 729942293.
- Entick, John (1763). The General History of the Late War. London: Edward Dilly and John Millan. ISBN 9780665348075. OCLC 31532036.
- Laughton, J. K. (1894). "Mathews, Thomas (1676–1751)". In Lee, Sidney (ed.). Dictionary of National Biography. Vol. 37. New York: Macmillan and Co. OCLC 1042961536.
- McGuffie, T. H. (1951). "Some Fresh Light on the Siege of Minorca, 1756". Journal of the Society for Army Historical Research. 29 (119): 111–115. JSTOR 44222663.
- Mahan, A. T. (2010) [1894]. The Influence of Sea Power Upon History, 1660–1783. Dover Publications. ISBN 978-0-4861-3102-3.
- Meyer, Jean; Acerra, Martine (1994). Histoire de la Marine française : des origines à nos jours (in French). Rennes: Editions Ouest-France. ISBN 978-2-7373-1129-1.
- Richmond, H. W. (1920). The Navy in the War of 1739–48. Cambridge: Cambridge University Press. OCLC 59768128.
- Sanderson, Michael (1975). Sea Battles: A Reference Guide. Newton Abbot: David & Charles. ISBN 978-0-7153-6648-6.
- Willis, Sam (2009). "The Battle of Lagos, 1759". The Journal of Military History. 73 (3). ISSN 0899-3718.
- Winfield, Rif; Roberts, Stephen S. (2017). French Warships in the Age of Sail 1626–1786. Barnsley: Seaforth Publishing. ISBN 978-1-4738-9353-5.
- Winfield, Rif (2007). British Warships in the Age of Sail 1714–1792. Barnsley: Seaforth Publishing. ISBN 978-1-84415-700-6.
- Yonge, C. D. (1866). The history of the british navy, from the earliest period to the present time. Richard Bentley. OCLC 669171700.
