= Peter Denis =

English naval officer and MP (1713–1778)

Vice-Admiral Sir Peter Denis Bt MP
- Born: 1713; Chester
- Died: 11 June 1778 (aged 64–65); Maze Hill House, Greenwich
- Spouse: Elizabeth Pappet (m. 1750–1765)
- Military career
- Allegiance: Great Britain
- Branch: Royal Navy
- Service years: 1724–1778
- Rank: Vice-Admiral
- Commands: HMS Swift; HMS Greyhound; HMS Folkeston; HMS Windsor; HMS Centurion; HMS Medway; HMS Royal George; HMS Namur; HMS Dorsetshire; HMS Thunderer; HMS Bellona; Basque Roads Command; HMY Charlotte; Medway Command; Mediterranean Fleet
- Conflicts: War of the Austrian Succession; George Anson's voyage around the world; First Battle of Cape Finisterre; Seven Years' War; Raid on Rochefort; Action of 29 April 1758; Battle of Quiberon Bay; American Revolutionary War

Member of Parliament for Hedon
- In office 1754–1768

Vice-Admiral Sir Peter Denis, 1st Baronet MP (c.1713 – 11 June 1778) was an English naval officer and Member of Parliament.

== Life ==
The son of Huguenot refugee, the Rev. Jacob Denis and his wife Martha Leach, Denis was educated at The King's School, Chester and joined the navy as a young man. He was a midshipman in HMS Centurion under the command of Commodore George Anson at the start of his famous circumnavigation (1740–1744). He was promoted to lieutenant in 1739. On 5 November 1741, in the South Seas, he was sent in command of 16 men in a cutter to pursue a Spanish vessel. He boarded and carried his prize, which proved to be bound from Guayaquil to Callao. The cargo was of little value to its captors, but intelligence derived from the capture led to the attack on the town of Paita a few days afterwards.

By 1745 Denis had been promoted to command and given the 26-gun sixth rate HMS Greyhound. Soon afterwards he was transferred to temporary command of HMS Windsor, during which time he captured a French privateer and recaptured two British merchantmen. By 1747 Denis was back in the 50-gun Centurion as her captain, commanding her at the Battle of Cape Finisterre, where he once more served under Anson, now an admiral. When the enemy was sighted, Anson signalled a general chase as he expected the French to evade action if possible until they could escape under cover of darkness; Centurion was swiftest into action, engaging the rearmost French ship and occupying her and two larger enemy ships until the main body of the British fleet could come up. After the battle Denis was entrusted with bringing back to England the news of Anson's victory; as the public acclaim that followed won Anson a peerage, this may well have further endeared Denis to Anson.

On 2 September 1750, he married Elizabeth Pappett at St Benet's, Paul's Wharf, London. She died in 1765 without issue.

In 1754, Denis entered Parliament as member for Hedon, a Yorkshire borough where Anson was the "patron" with the power to select the MPs. He held the seat for fourteen years, throughout which time the other MP was another naval officer, Sir Charles Saunders, who later rose to become First Lord of the Admiralty.

Denis continued his naval career, commanding the 90-gun HMS Namur in Admiral Edward Hawke's unsuccessful expedition against Rochefort in September 1757. At the action of 29 April 1758, he was captain of the 70-gun HMS Dorsetshire which defeated and captured French ship of the line Raisonnable in the Bay of Biscay. Dorsetshire was with the fleet at the decisive victory of Quiberon Bay in 1759. In 1767 he was created a baronet, of St Mary's in the County of Kent, but as he left no male heir the title became extinct on his death.

Escutcheon of the Denis baronets of St Mary's

Denis became Commander-in-Chief, The Nore, based on the River Medway in 1771 with his flag in the third-rate HMS Trident.

He died in 1778, having reached the rank of Vice-Admiral of the Red. He was buried at St. George the Martyr Cemetery, Brunswick Square, beside his mother Martha (d.1746), his wife Elizabeth (d.1765), his brother Charles (d.1772), and his sisters Susanna (d.1776) and Ann (d.1793).

Parliament of Great Britain
Preceded by Sir John Savile; Luke Robinson	Member of Parliament for Hedon; 1754–1768; With: Sir Charles Saunders	Succeeded by Sir Charles Saunders; Beilby Thompson
Baronetage of Great Britain
New creation	Baronet (of St Mary's); 1767–1778	Extinct
Preceded by Hort baronets	Denis baronets of St Mary's; 28 October 1767	Succeeded by Burnaby baronets
