= HMS Achilles (1757) =

Ship of the line of the Royal Navy

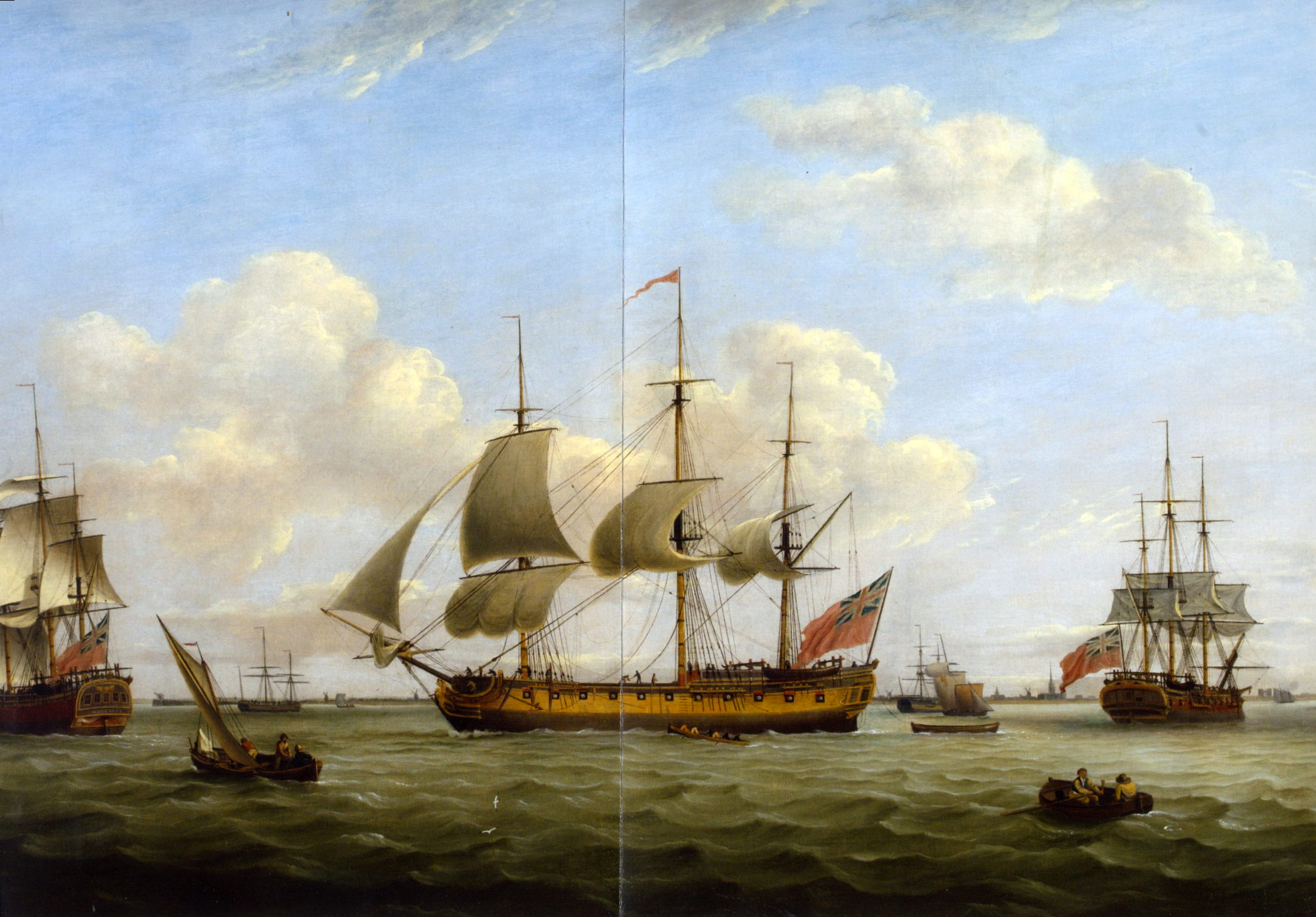
- HMS Maria Anna, Earl of Chatham and Achilles (far right) off a coastal town

History

Great Britain
- Name: HMS Achilles
- Ordered: 14 November 1755
- Builder: Barnard & Turner, Harwich
- Laid down: December 1755
- Launched: 6 February 1757
- Completed: By 17 May 1757
- Fate: Sold on 1 June 1784

General characteristics
- Class & type: 1750 amendments 60-gun fourth-rate ship of the line
- Tons burthen: 1,234 21/94 bm
- Length: 153 ft 10 in (46.9 m) (overall); 127 ft 6 in (38.9 m) (keel)
- Beam: 42 ft 8 in (13.0 m)
- Depth of hold: 18 ft 9 in (5.7 m)
- Propulsion: Sails
- Sail plan: Full-rigged ship
- Complement: 420
- Armament: Lower deck: 24 × 24-pounders; Upper deck: 26 × 12-pounders; Quarter deck: 8 × 6-pounders; Forecastle: 2 × 6-pounders

HMS Achilles was a 60-gun fourth-rate ship of the line of the Royal Navy, built by Barnard and Turner at Harwich to the draught specified by the 1745 Establishment as amended in 1750, and launched in 1757. She was ordered in November 1755. HMS Achilles was a Dunkirk-class fourth rate, along with HMS Dunkirk and HMS America.

== Career ==
HMS Achilles was launched on 6 February 1757 at Harwich. At the action of 29 April 1758, she was detached along with HMS Dorsetshire in pursuit of the 64-gun French ship Raisonnable. Dorsetshire engaged Raisonnable first, followed by Achilles. After sustaining 35 casualties, Raisonnable was taken and later purchased for the Navy as HMS Raisonnable.

On 4 April 1759 Achilles under Samuel Barrington engaged and captured the 60-gun French coastguard vessel St Florentine in a two-hour battle. Achilles sustained 2 killed and 23 wounded. Later that year, Achilles was the flagship of Rear-Admiral George Rodney when he sailed to Le Havre on 3 July. The fleet included four 50-gun ships, along with five frigates, a sloop and six bomb ketches which destroyed landing barges assembled in the harbour for a possible invasion of England. Achilles remained at Le Havre for the rest of the year.

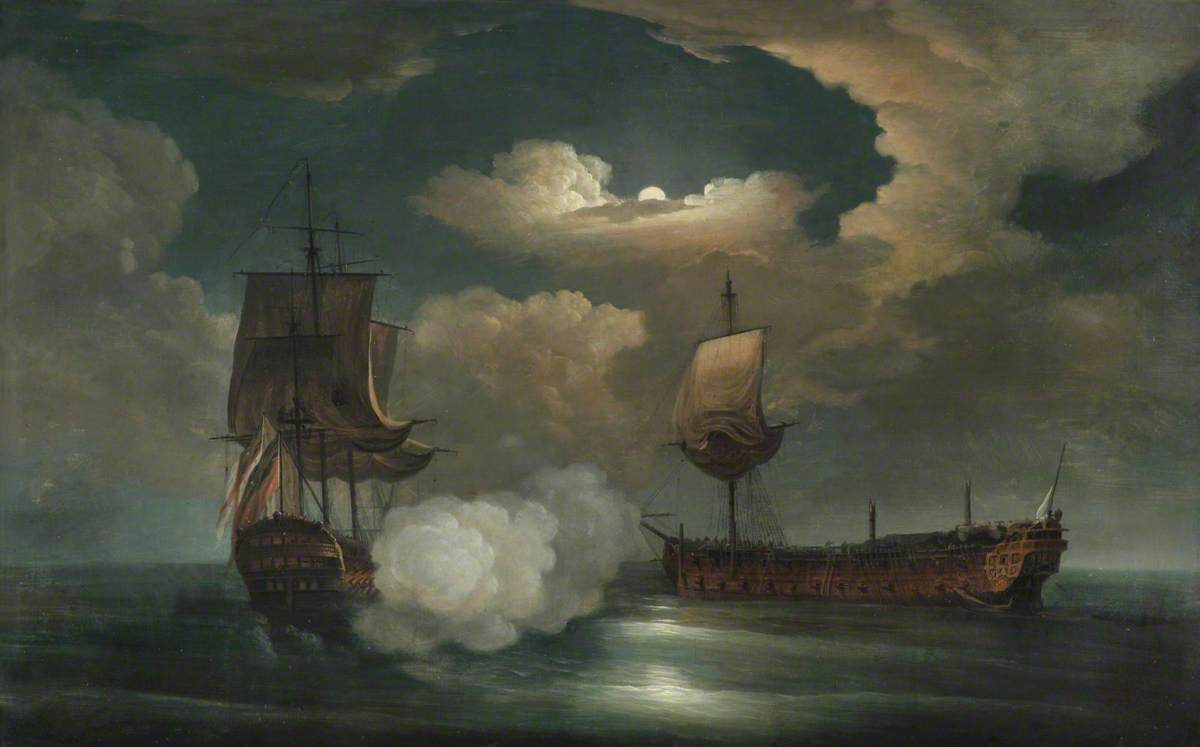
The Capture of the Comte de St Florentine by HMS Achilles, 4 April 1759, by Dominic Serres

On 28 March 1762 Achilles, along with several other warships and transports carrying 10,000 troops, set sail from Saint Helens to attack the French at Belleisle. The fleet arrived on 7 April. The next day the army attempted a landing under the cover of Achilles's guns. The attack was forced back and the army lost 500 soldiers killed, wounded or captured. The army finally landed successfully on 22 April and besieged the French in Le Palais until the French surrendered on 7 June.

Achilles became the guardship at Portsmouth in 1763. She was hulked in 1782 and sold on 1 June 1784 to Boddy & Bacon, merchants of London for repurposing as a cargo vessel. Despite remaining "as sound as the day she was launched," the former Achilles was finally retired and broken up for timber in 1791.

== Bibliography ==
- Rosier, Barrington (2010). "The Construction Costs of Eighteenth-Century Warships". The Mariner's Mirror. 92 (2): 164. doi:10.1080/00253359.2010.10657134. S2CID 161774448.
