= Raissonable =

Raissonable is the name of some warships:

- French ship Raisonnable (1756), a French Navy 64-gun ship of the line, captured by the British in 1758 and renamed HMS Raisonabble
- HMS Raisonnable (1768), a Royal Navy 64-gun ship of the line
