= Action of 29 April 1758 =

1758 naval battle of the Seven Years' War

- Part of the Seven Years' War
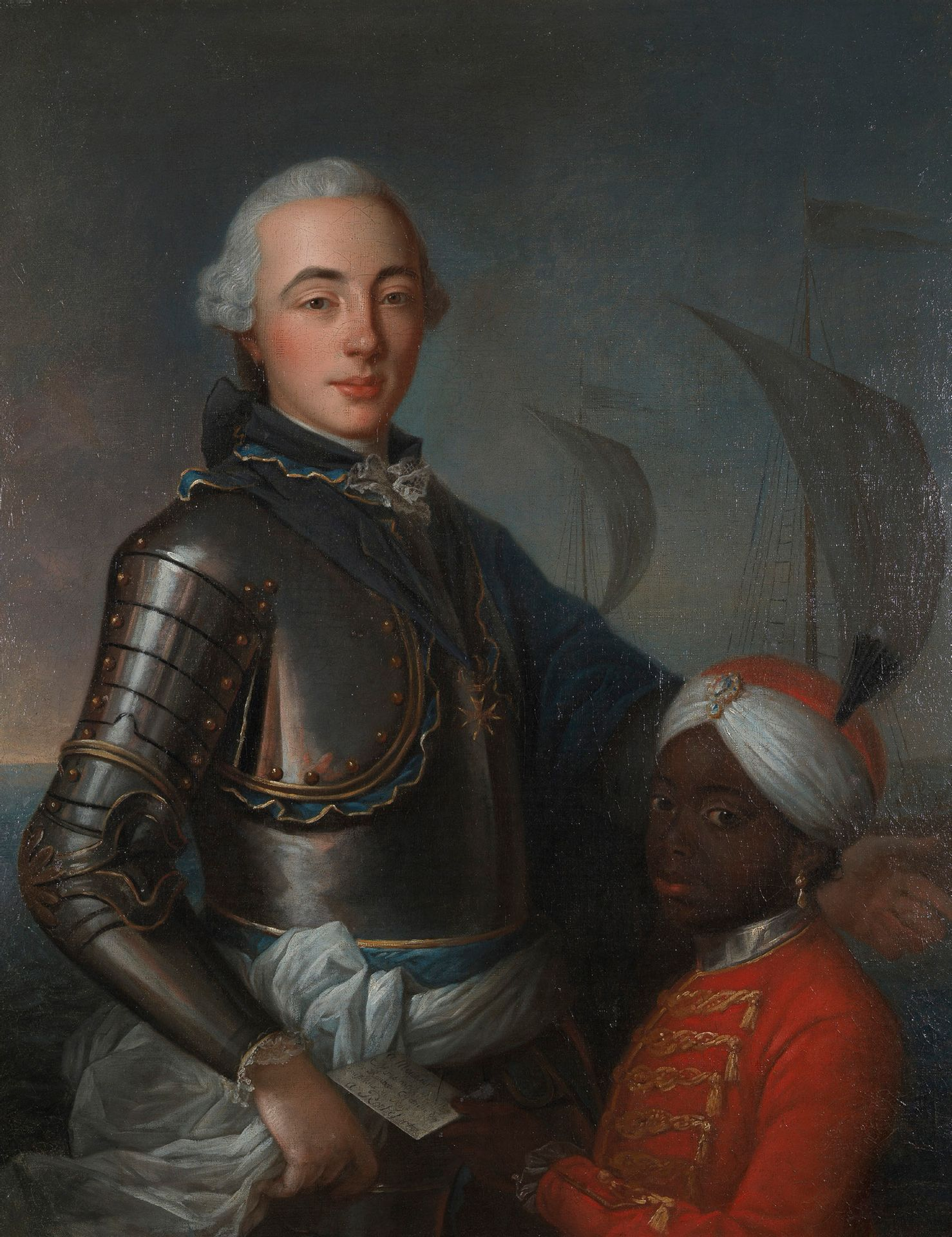
- 1758 portrait of Louis de Rohan
Date	29 April 1758
Location	Bay of Biscay, Atlantic Ocean
Result	British victory

Belligerents
Great Britain	France

Commanders and leaders
Peter Denis	Louis de Rohan (surrendered)

Strength
2 ships of the line	1 ship of the line

Casualties and losses
16 killed 20 wounded	61 killed 100 wounded 1 ship of the line captured

The action of 29 April 1758 was a naval engagement fought in the Bay of Biscay near Brest between a British Royal Navy squadron and a single French Navy ship of the line during the Seven Years' War. In an attempt to support the garrison of Louisbourg, who were facing an impending siege, the French Atlantic Fleet sent a number of squadrons and ships to sea during the spring of 1758. To intercept these ships, Royal Navy squadrons maintained a close blockade of their main port at Brest. In April a British squadron including HMS Intrepid, HMS Dorsetshire and HMS Achilles was cruising off the French Biscay Coast when a lone sail was sighted to the southwest. Dorsetshire, commanded by Captain Peter Denis was sent to investigate, discovering the ship to be the French ship of the line Raisonnable sailing to Louisbourg. In a fierce battle, Dorsetshire managed to inflict heavy casualties on the French ship and force her captain, Louis-Armand-Constantin de Rohan, to surrender.

== Action ==
In 1758 the British Royal Navy Channel Fleet and the French Navy Atlantic Fleet were contesting control of the Bay of Biscay and the Atlantic Ocean during the Seven Years' War, which had broken out between Britain and France in 1755 over colonial dominance in North America. For the French Navy the priority was maintaining their lines of supply to the major French Canadian fortress of Louisbourg, which was soon to fall under siege. To support the city, the French Atlantic Fleet sent squadrons and single ships into the Atlantic to bring supplies and reinforcements to the garrison and the Royal Navy in turn deployed forces to intercept these missions.

One squadron deployed in close blockade at Brest in April 1758 was commanded by Captain Edward Pratten in HMS Intrepid. On 19 April, a sail was sighted to the southwest and Pratten detached the 70-gun HMS Dorsetshire under Captain Peter Denis to investigate. The ship proved to be the 64-gun French ship of the line Raisonnable under Captain Louis-Armand-Constantin de Rohan, Chevalier de Rohan and Prince de Montbazon. Realising the strength of the French ship, Pratten subsequently detached the 60-gun HMS Achilles under Captain Samuel Barrington to support Dorsetshire.

Before Achilles could arrive, Denis succeeded in bringing Dorsetshire alongside the French ship and in a fierce broadside engagement successfully forcing Rohan to strike his colours. Barrington's ship only arrived in range in the final minutes, confirming the French surrender. French casualties were heavy, with 61 killed and 100 wounded, while losses on Dorsetshire numbered 15 killed and 21 wounded, one of whom subsequently died. Raisonnable was subsequently repaired and commissioned into the Royal Navy under the same name, serving until she was accidentally wrecked at Martinique in February 1762. The Siege of Louisbourg went ahead in June 1758, and the city fell the following month, blockaded from reinforcement by the Royal Navy.

== Bibliography ==
- Clowes, William Laird (1997) [1900]. The Royal Navy, A History from the Earliest Times to 1900, Volume III. London: Chatham Publishing. ISBN 1-86176-012-4.
