= Portrait of Augustus Keppel =

1749 painting by Joshua Reynolds

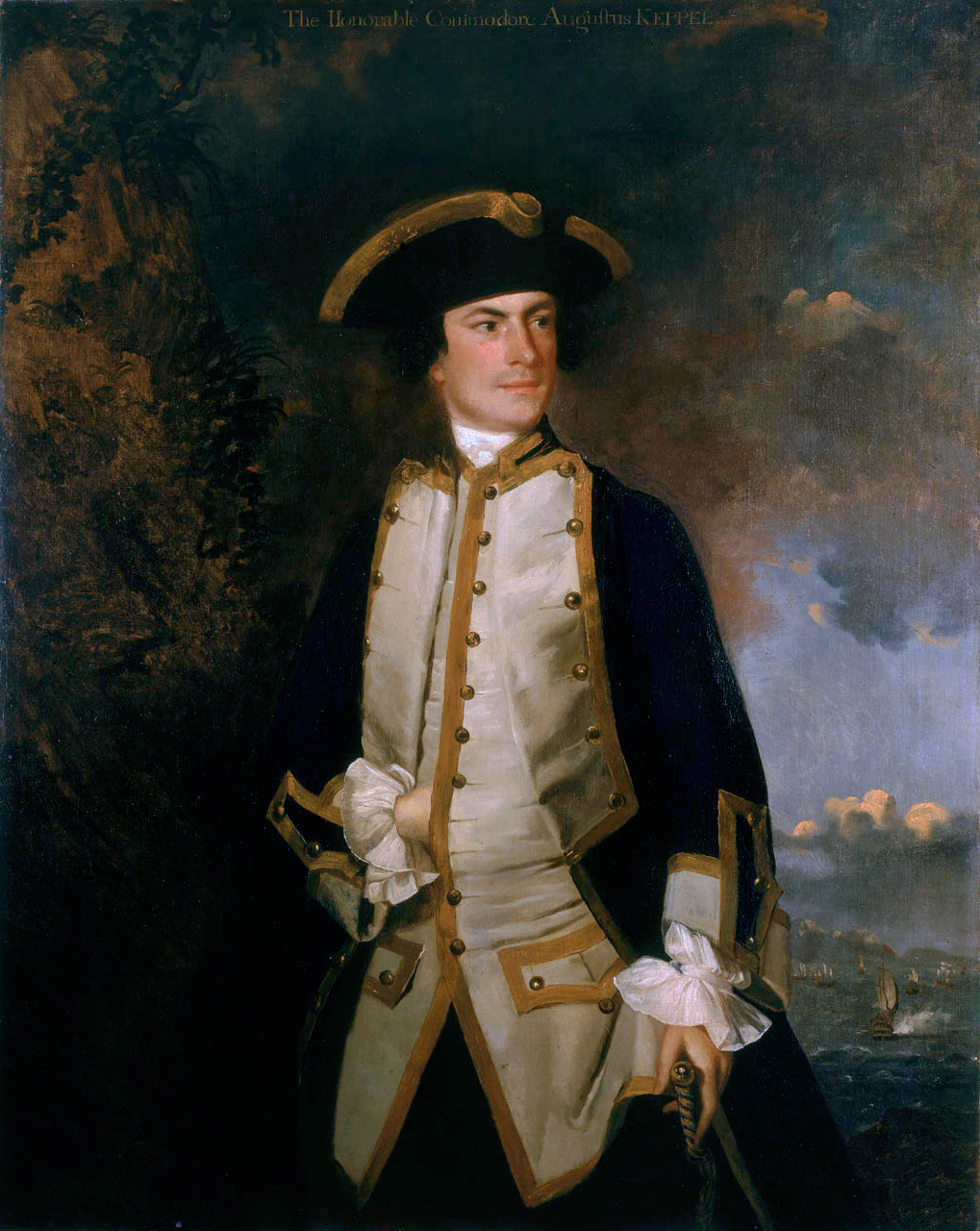
- Artist: Joshua Reynolds
- Year: 1749
- Type: Oil on canvas, portrait painting
- Dimensions: 127 cm × 101.5 cm (50 in × 40.0 in)
- Location: National Maritime Museum, London

Portrait of Augustus Keppel is a 1749 portrait painting by the English artist Joshua Reynolds and depicting the British naval officer Augustus Keppel. The two men met the same year at the artist accompanied Keppel on an expedition to the Mediterranean. He sat for Reynolds at Port Mahon and Minorca is depicted in the background. Visible on the right is a squadron of Royal Navy ships led by the Centurion. In contrast to the more epic style Reynolds would later use for military figures, Keppel is portrayed as "upstanding and admirable, but he is hardly a transcendent hero".

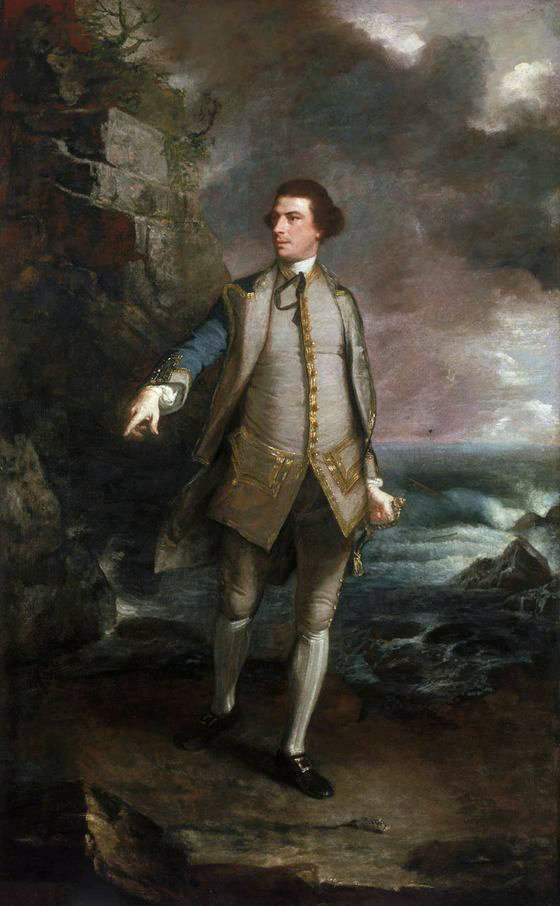
Portrait of Keppel in 1752.

It was the first of numerous portraits he would paint of Keppel throughout his career. Today it is in the collection of the National Maritime Museum in Greenwich. Reynolds painted a full-length portrait of Keppel as in 1752, which is also in the Museum.

== Bibliography ==
- De Bruyn, Frans & Regan, Shaun (ed.) ''The Culture of the Seven Years' War: Empire, Identity, and the Arts in the Eighteenth-Century Atlantic World. University of Toronto Press, 2014.
- Esposito, Donato. Sir Joshua Reynolds: The Acquisition of Genius. Sansom, 2009.
- Fullager, Kate. The Warrior, the Voyager, and the Artist: Three Lives in an Age of Empire. Yale University Press, 2020.
- Mancini, J.M. Art and War in the Pacific World: Making, Breaking, and Taking from Anson's Voyage to the Philippine-American War. Univ of California Press, 2018.
