= HMS Reserve (1704) =

Ship of the line of the Royal Navy

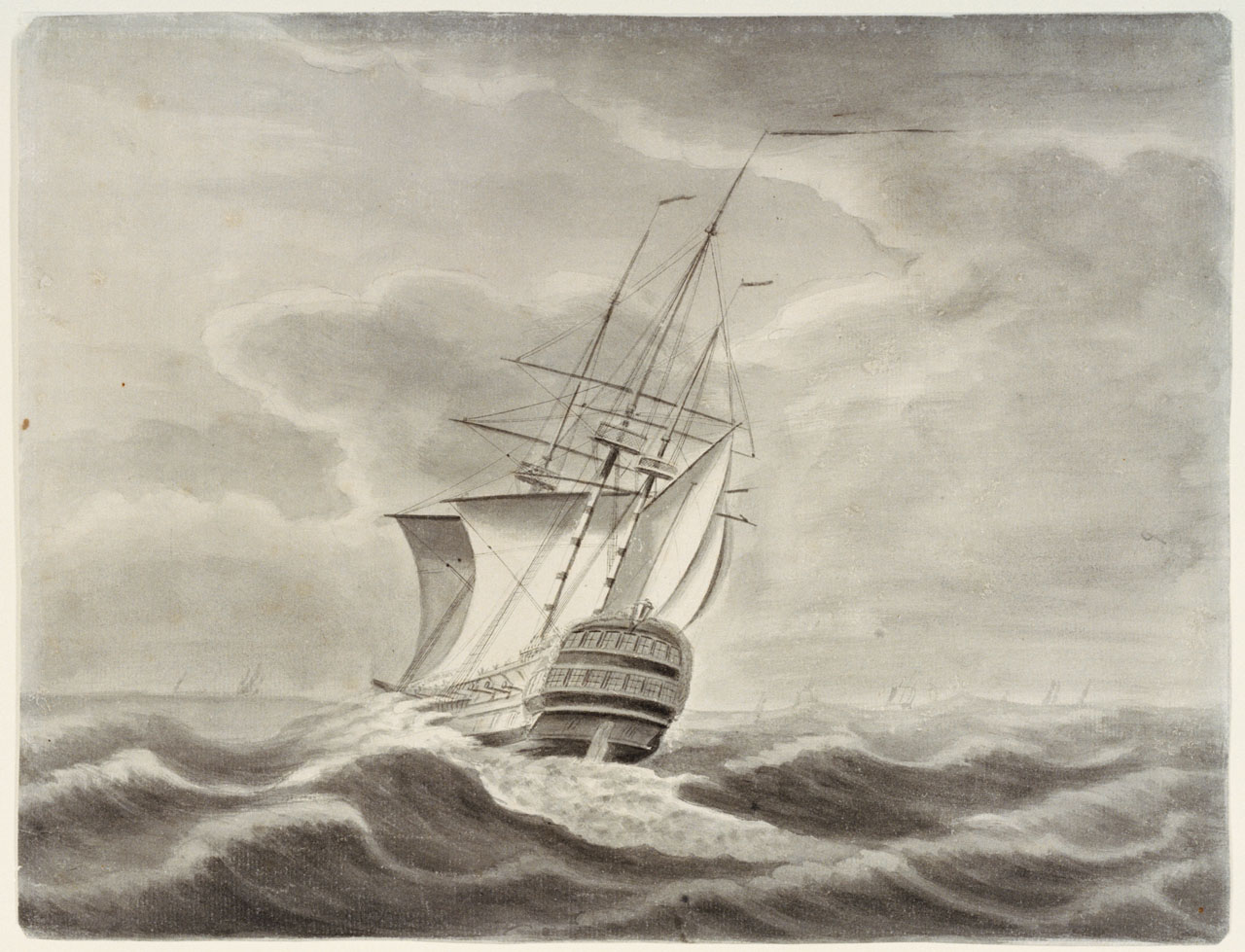
- The Sutherland hospital ship, commanded by Sir John Bentley in the year 1741 & 1744, sketched by his clerk, John Hood

History

Great Britain
- Name: HMS Reserve
- Builder: Harding, Deptford Dockyard
- Launched: 18 March 1704
- Renamed: HMS Sutherland, 1716
- Fate: Broken up, 1754
- Notes: Hospital ship from 1741

General characteristics
- Class & type: 50-gun fourth rate ship of the line
- Tons burthen: 676
- Length: 130 ft (39.6 m) (gundeck)
- Beam: 34 ft 5 1/2 in (10.5 m)
- Depth of hold: 13 ft 6 1/2 in (4.1 m)
- Propulsion: Sails
- Sail plan: Full-rigged ship
- Armament: 50 guns of various weights of shot

HMS Reserve was a 50-gun fourth rate ship of the line of the Royal Navy, built at Deptford Dockyard and launched on 18 March 1704.

Reserve was renamed HMS Sutherland in 1716, and converted to serve as a hospital ship in 1741. Sutherland was broken up in 1754.
