= John Bentley (Royal Navy officer) =

Sir John Bentley (d. 1772), vice-admiral, may have entered the Royal Navy before the Battle of Cape Passaro, and was made lieutenant during the 1730s. In the Battle of Toulon, 11 February 1743-4 (OS), he was a lieutenant of the Namur, Mathews' flag-ship, and was immediately afterwards promoted to the command of the Sutherland hospital-ship. On 1 August 1744 he was posted into Burford, 70, and a few months later was sent home as a witness on the courts martial which rendered the years 1745-6 notorious. In the spring of 1747, when Anson took command of the Channel fleet, Bentley was chosen to be his flag captain in the Prince George, and was with him in the Battle of Cape Finisterre, 3 May (OS). When the fleet returned to England, and Anson hauled down his flag, Bentley was transferred to the Defiance, 60, in which he shared in Hawke's victory in the Bay of Biscay, 14 October 1747 (OS). He afterwards, during the peace, successively commanded the Invincible, the Charlotte yacht, and the Barfleur, at Portsmouth, and in 1757 was a member of the court martial on Admiral Byng. In 1758 he was again in command of the Invincible, one of the finest 74-gun ships in the service, and which he had himself helped Anson to capture from the French. She was under orders to proceed to Louisbourg with Admiral Boscawen, when, on 19 February, weighing from St. Helen's, her rudder jammed, and she grounded heavily on the Dean Sand. In the evening it came on to blow very hard, and the ship became a complete wreck. Bentley, with his officers, was acquitted of all blame (Minutes of the Court Martial), and shortly afterwards appointed to the Warspite, which through the summer of 1759 was in the Mediterranean with Boscawen, and on 18 August when the French squadron, under De la Clue, was defeated. On the 19th, when the ships that had sought refuge in Lagos Bay were captured or destroyed, it was by Bentley's exertions that the Téméraire, which had been run ashore was brought off and added to the strength of the British navy. In September Bentley was sent to England, was presented to the king, was knighted, and, still in the Warspite was ordered to join Hawke in the blockade of Brest. It was thus his peculiar fortune, after sharing in the defeat of De la Clue, to be present also in the great victory of Quiberon Bay, 20 November 1759. The Warspite continued through 1760 attached to the grand fleet under Hawke, but the victory of 1759 had minimised the action of the navy in European waters, and Bentley's further service afloat was uneventful. In 1761 he was appointed to a commissionership of the navy, but resigned it on being promoted to his flag, 28 December 1763. He held no further command, but became a vice-admiral in October 1770, and died on 3 January 1772.
