= USS Ebert (DE-768) =

United States Navy destroyer escort (1944-46)

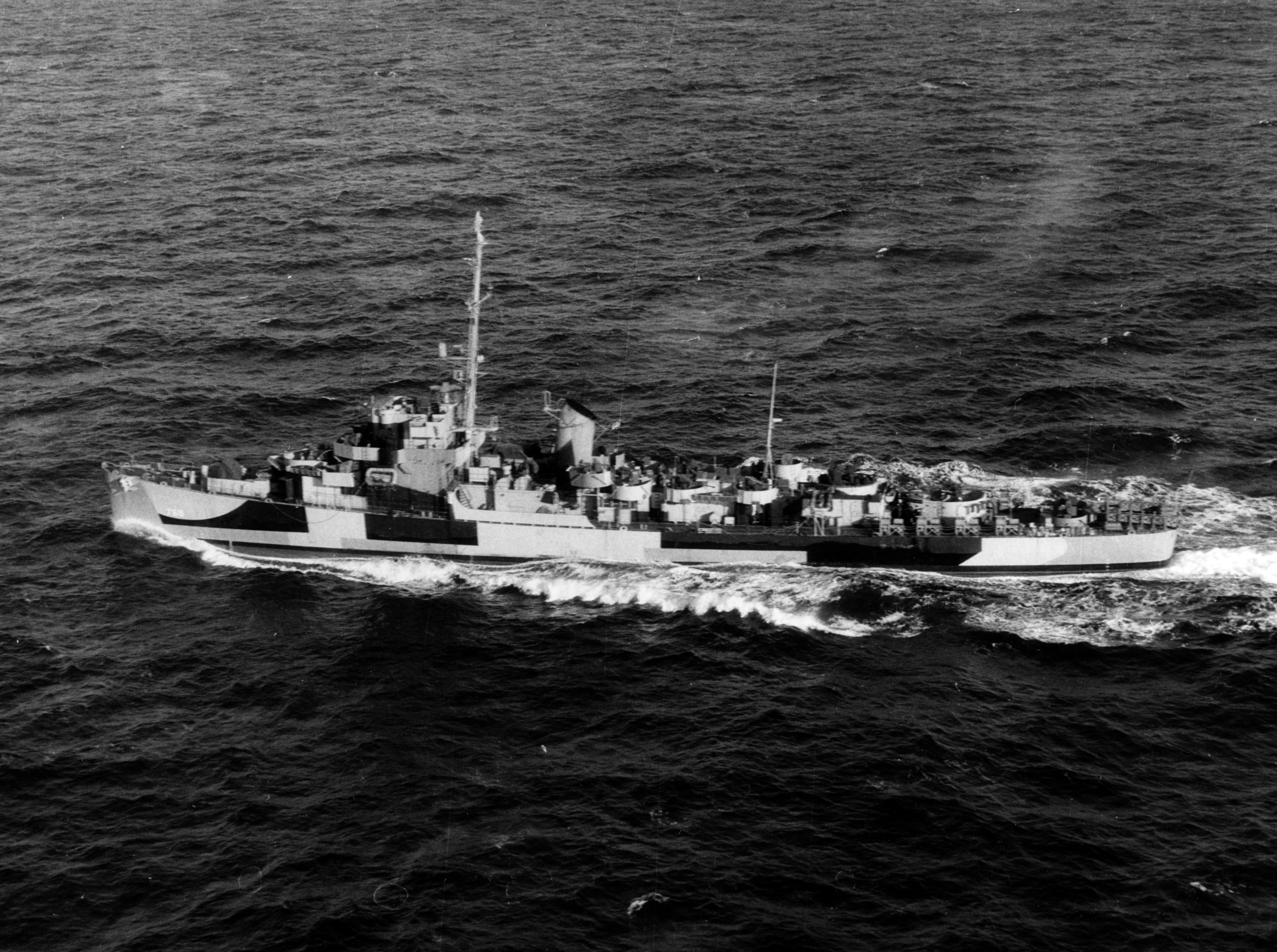

History

United States
- Name: USS Ebert
- Namesake: Hilan Ebert
- Builder: Tampa Shipbuilding Company, Tampa, Florida
- Laid down: 1 April 1943
- Launched: 11 May 1944
- Commissioned: 12 July 1944
- Decommissioned: 14 June 1946
- Stricken: 7 March 1951
- Identification: DE-768
- Fate: Transferred to Greece, 1 March 1951

Greece
- Name: Ierax
- Acquired: 1 March 1951
- Stricken: 1991
- Identification: D31
- Fate: Sunk as target, July 2002

General characteristics
- Class & type: Cannon-class destroyer escort
- Displacement: 1,240 long tons (1,260 t) standard; 1,620 long tons (1,646 t) full
- Length: 306 ft (93 m) o/a; 300 ft (91 m) w/l
- Beam: 36 ft 10 in (11.23 m)
- Draft: 11 ft 8 in (3.56 m)
- Propulsion: 4 × GM Mod. 16-278A diesel engines with electric drive, 6,000 shp (4,474 kW), 2 screws
- Speed: 21 knots (39 km/h; 24 mph)
- Range: 10,800 nmi (20,000 km) at 12 kn (22 km/h; 14 mph)
- Complement: 15 officers and 201 enlisted
- Armament: 3 × single Mk.22 3"/50 caliber guns; 1 × twin 40 mm Mk.1 AA gun; 8 × 20 mm Mk.4 AA guns; 3 × 21 inch (533 mm) torpedo tubes; 1 × Hedgehog Mk.10 anti-submarine mortar (144 rounds); 8 × Mk.6 depth charge projectors; 2 × Mk.9 depth charge tracks

USS Ebert (DE-768) was a Cannon-class destroyer escort in service with the United States Navy from 1944 to 1946. In 1951, she was transferred to Greece, where she served as Ierax (D31) until 1991. She was finally sunk as a target in 2002.

== Namesake ==
Hilan Ebert was born on 21 March 1903 in Alliance, Ohio. He graduated from the United States Naval Academy in 1926 and served in various billets afloat and ashore until assigned to USS Northampton on 29 April 1942. Lieutenant Commander Ebert was killed on 30 November 1942 when his ship was torpedoed in the Battle of Tassafaronga off Guadalcanal. He was posthumously awarded the Navy Cross.

== History ==
=== United States Navy (1944-1951) ===
Ebert was launched on 11 May 1944 by Tampa Shipbuilding Co., Inc., Tampa, Florida; sponsored by Mrs. Hilan Ebert, widow of Lieutenant Commander Ebert; and commissioned on 12 July 1944.

Ebert guarded the passage of convoys carrying men and supplies vital to victory in Europe, to ports in Great Britain and France, between 6 October 1944 and 14 May 1945, then returned to New York City to prepare for duty in the Pacific.

She sailed on 8 June for Pearl Harbor, Eniwetok, and the Philippines. She escorted convoys carrying occupation troops to Japan, until 30 November when she left Manila for the United States.

=== Hellenic Navy (1951-2002) ===
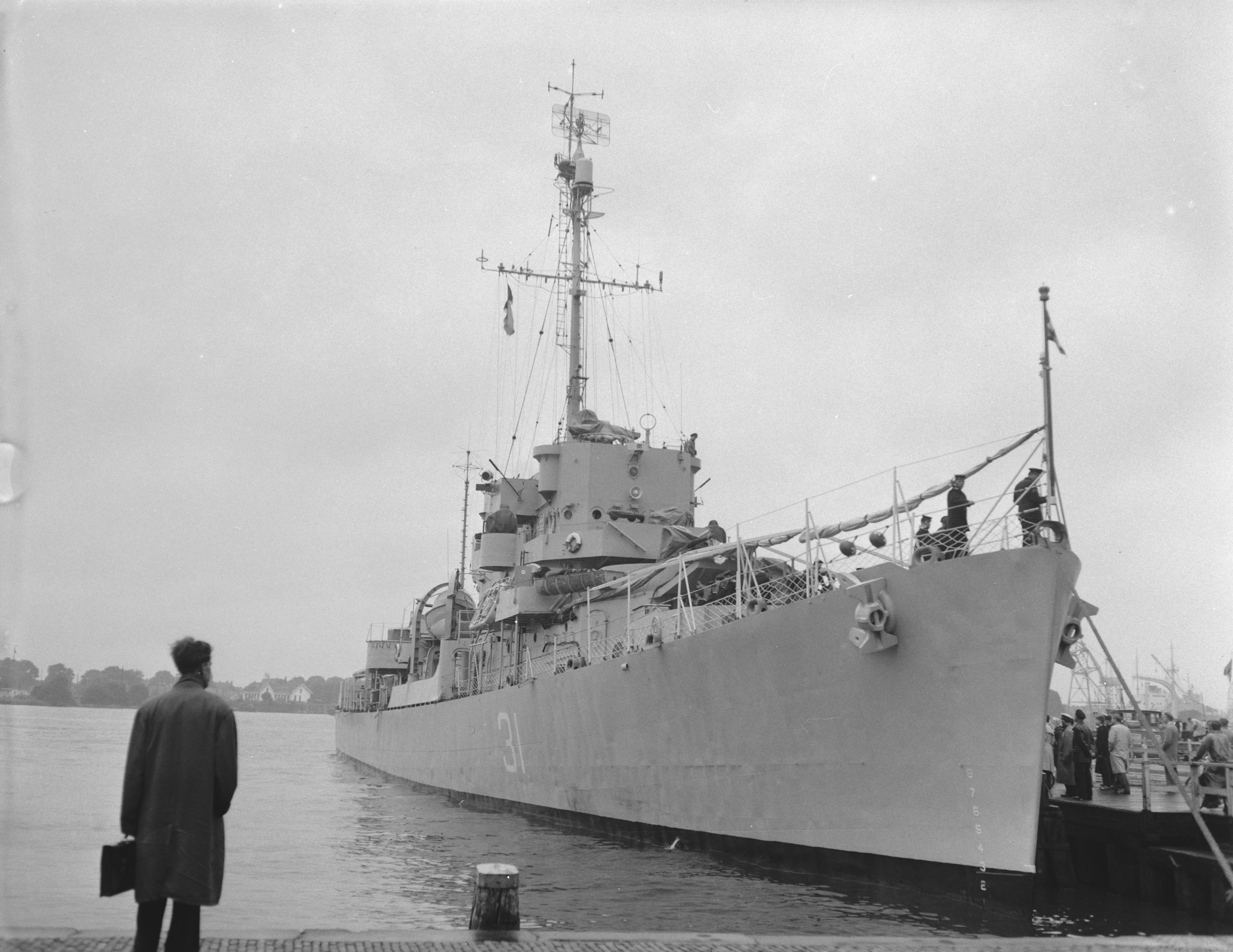
Ierax in Amsterdam, 1958

Ebert was placed out of commission in reserve at Green Cove Springs, Florida, on 14 June 1946. Towed to Boston, Massachusetts, in November 1950, Ebert was transferred to Greece on 1 March 1951 under the Mutual Defense Assistance Program.

She served in the Greek Navy as Ierax (D31) (Hawk), and was stricken in 1991. In January 1998, reports emerged that she was laid up in terminal reserve at the port of Souda, in Crete. Ierax was sunk as part of a Naval exercise (combination of Penguin missile and torpedo attack) in July 2002. Ierax now rests on the seabed of the Aegean Sea close to the island of Crete, at a depth of 950 meters (3,120 ft), located at 35°56.5′N 24°25.1′E.
