= First Battle of Cape Finisterre (1747) =

1747 battle of the War of the Austrian Succession

- Part of the War of the Austrian Succession
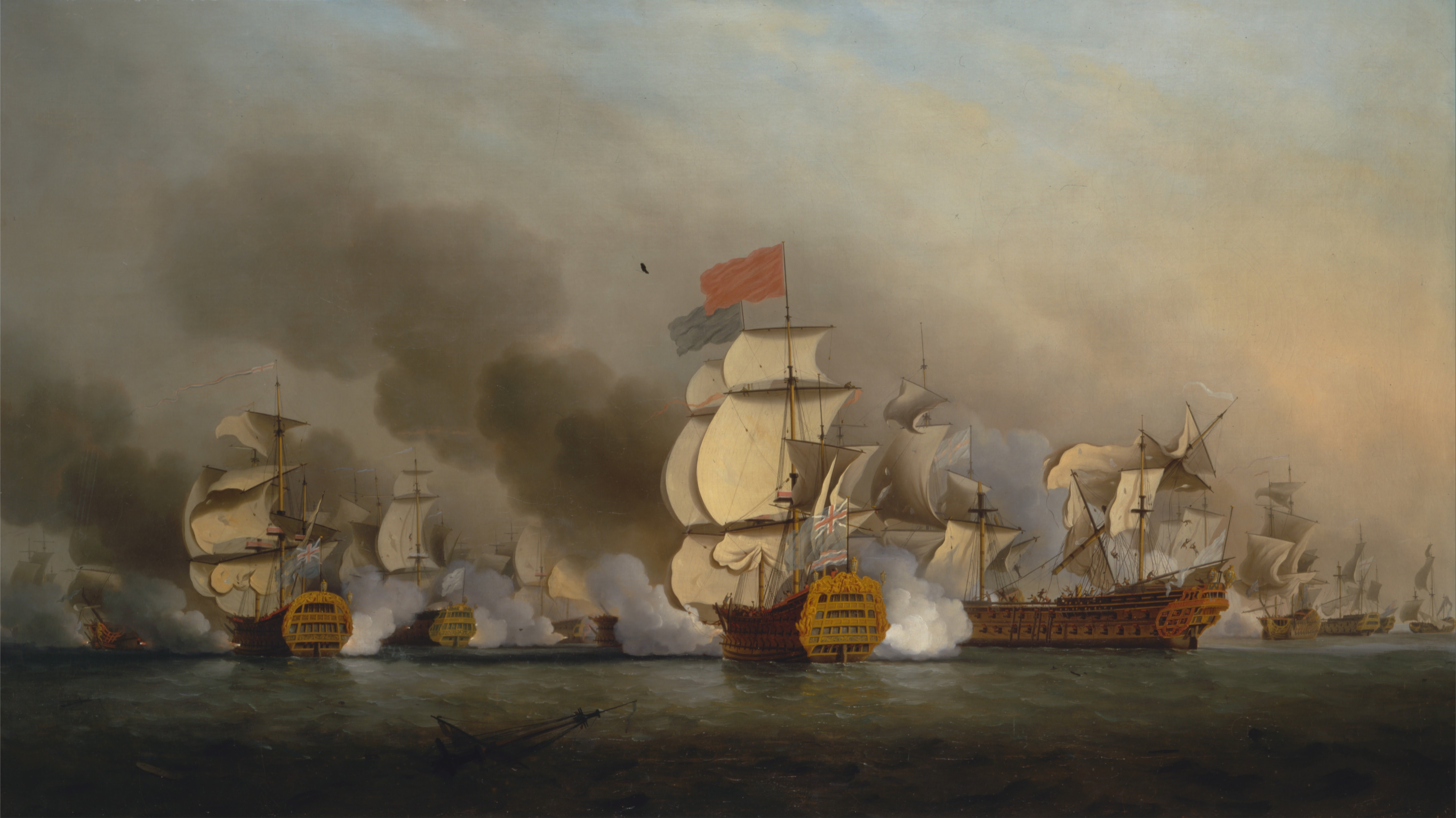
- Lord Anson's Victory off Cape Finisterre; Samuel Scott, 1749
Date	14 May 1747
Location	Off Cape Finisterre, Atlantic Ocean
Result	British victory

Belligerents
Great Britain	France

Commanders and leaders
George Anson	Pierre de la Jonquière (surrendered)

Strength
14 ships of the line 1 frigate 1 sloop 1 fireship	4 ships of the line 8 frigates 4 corvettes 30 merchantmen

Casualties and losses
520 killed or wounded	800 killed or wounded 3,000 captured 4 ships of the line captured 4 frigates captured 4 corvettes captured 6 merchantmen captured

The First Battle of Cape Finisterre (14 May 1747) was waged during the War of the Austrian Succession. It refers to the attack by 14 British ships of the line under Admiral George Anson against a French 30-ship convoy commanded by Admiral de la Jonquière. The French were attempting to protect their merchant ships by using warships with them. The British captured 4 ships of the line, 2 frigates, and 7 merchantmen, in a five-hour battle in the Atlantic Ocean off Cape Finisterre in northwest Spain. One French frigate, one French East India Company warship, and the other merchantmen escaped.

== Events ==
=== Prelude ===
France needed to keep shipping lanes open in order to maintain her overseas empire. To this end she assembled merchantmen into convoys protected by warships. Anson on Prince George and Rear-Admiral Sir Peter Warren on Devonshire had sailed from Plymouth on 9 April to intercept French shipping. When a large convoy was sighted, Anson made the signal to form line of battle. Rear-Admiral Warren, suspecting the enemy to be manoeuvring to promote the escape of the convoy, bore down and communicated his opinion to the admiral; the latter threw out a signal for a general chase.

=== Battle ===
Centurion under a press of sail, was the first to come up to the rearmost French ship, which she attacked severely, and two other ships dropped astern to her support. The action became general when three more British ships, including Devonshire, came up. The French, though much inferior in numbers, fought till seven in the evening, when all but two of their ships were taken, as well as nine East India merchantmen. The French lost 700 men killed and wounded, and the British 520. Over £300,000 was found on board the ships of war, which were turned into British ships.

François de Grasse, later the famous Comte, was wounded in this first battle. He was taken prisoner among the crew and officers on Gloire, which was captured.

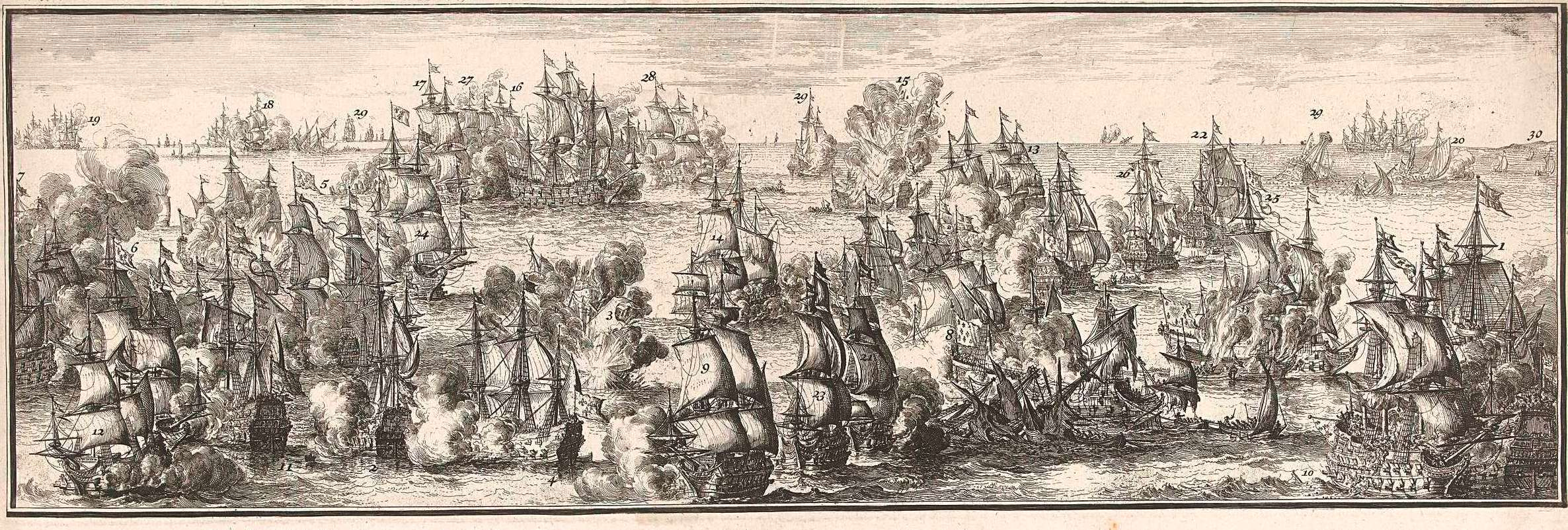
Panoramic sketch of the battle

=== Aftermath ===
Following his victory, Anson was raised to the peerage. The French assembled another, much bigger, convoy which set sail in October. After Edward Hawke's defeat of this fleet in the Second Battle of Cape Finisterre, the French naval operations were ended for the rest of the war.

According to American historian William Williamson's 1832 account, the battle was a

"most severe blow to the French interests in America. Besides immense property taken, there were found on board … numerous articles designed for the Acadians and Indians".

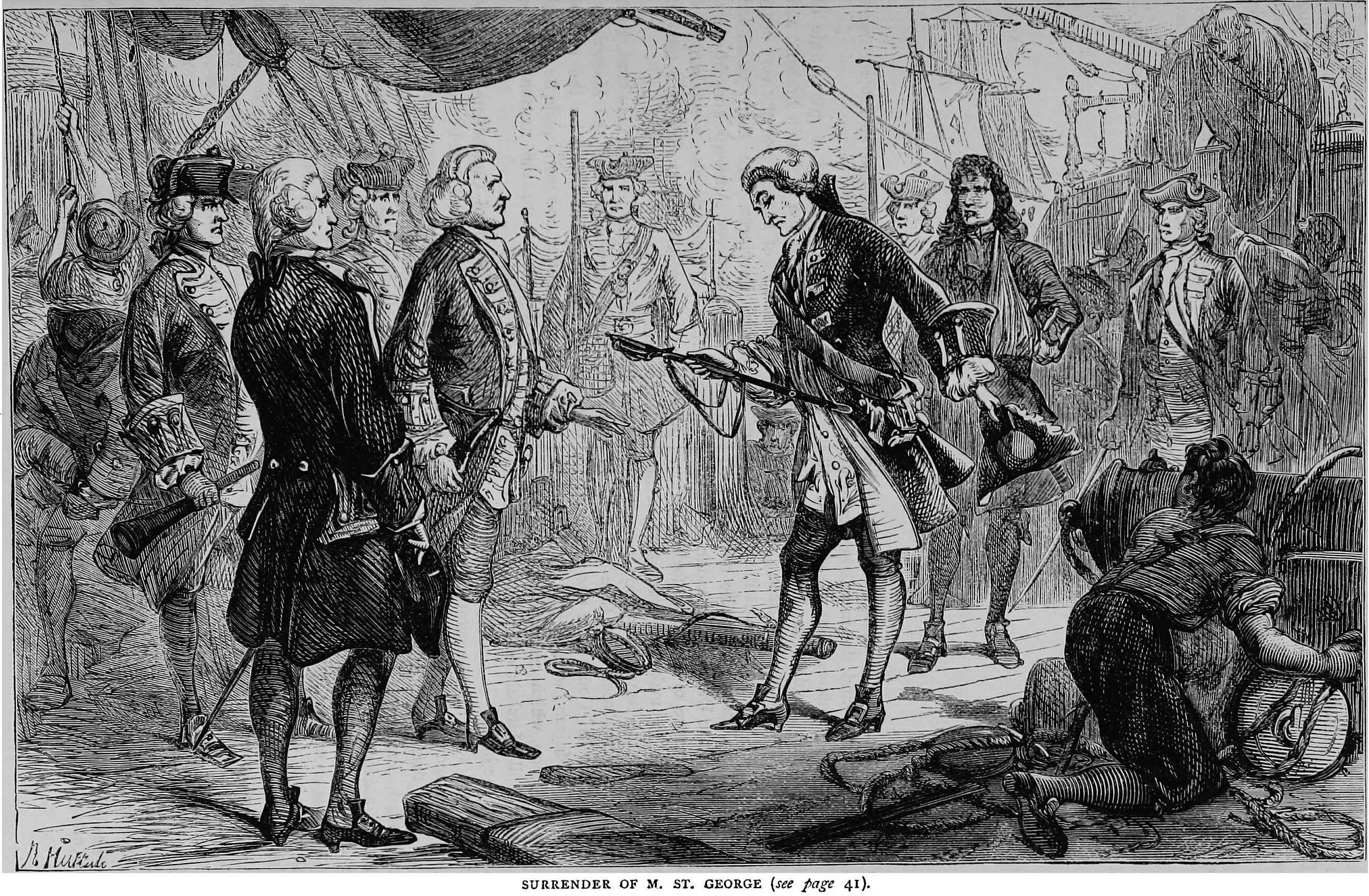
Chevalier de Saint-George of Invincible surrenders his sword to Admiral Anson after the battle

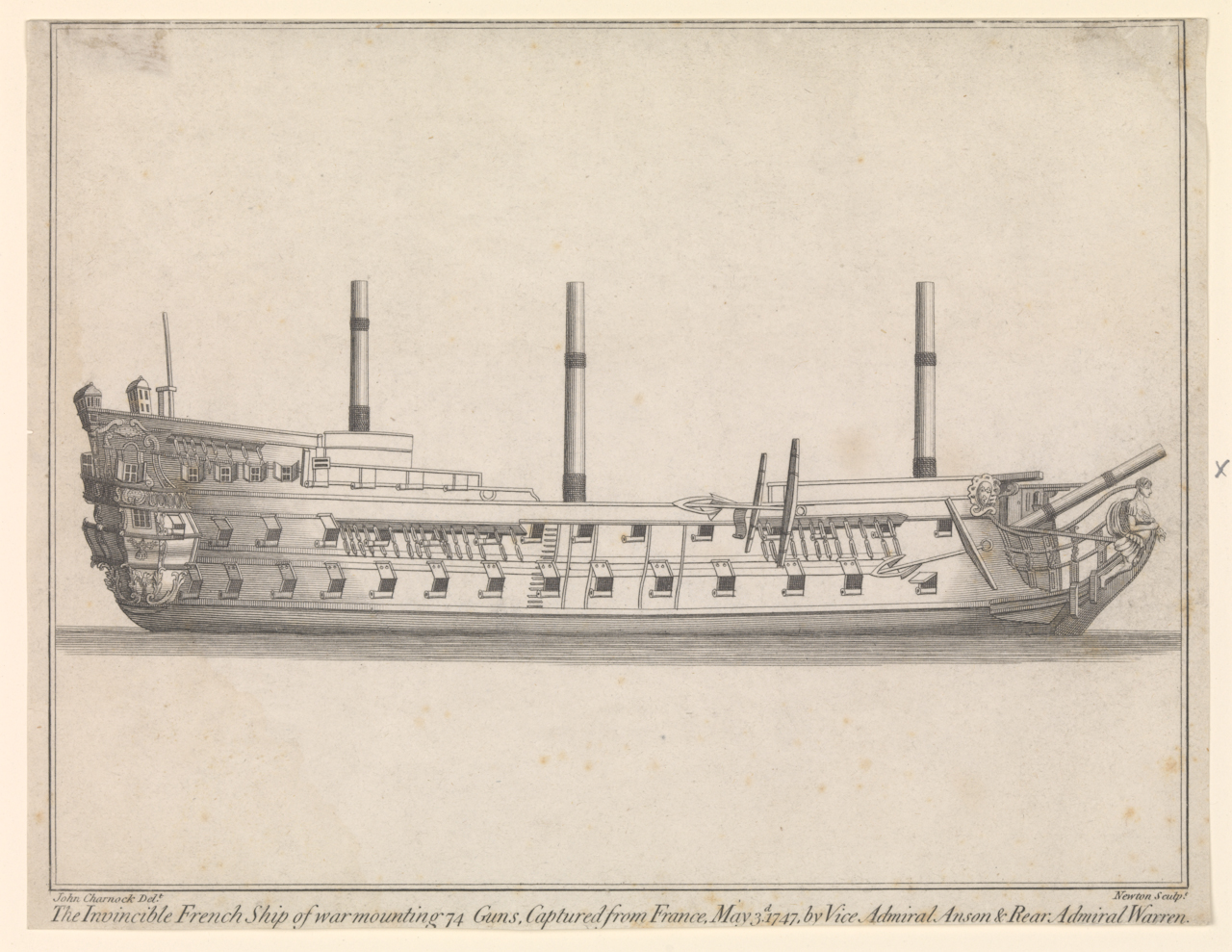
Print of Invincible captured after the battle

== Order of battle ==
=== Britain ===
Vice-Admiral Anson's fleet
Ship	Guns	Commander	Notes
Prince George	90	Vice-Admiral George Anson; Captain John Bentley	Not engaged
Devonshire	66	Rear-Admiral Peter Warren; Captain Temple West	
Namur	74	Captain Hon. Edward Boscawen	
Monmouth	64	Captain Henry Harrison	Not engaged
Prince Frederick	64	Captain Harry Norris	Not engaged
Yarmouth	64	Captain Piercy Brett	
Princess Louisa	60	Captain Charles Watson	Not engaged
Nottingham	60	Captain Philip de Saumarez	Not engaged
Defiance	60	Captain Thomas Grenville †	
Pembroke	60	Captain Thomas Fincher	
Windsor	60	Captain Thomas Hanway	
Centurion	50	Captain Peter Denis	
Falkland	50	Captain Blumfield Barradall	Not engaged
Bristol	50	Captain Hon. William Montagu	
Ambuscade	40	Captain John Montagu	Not engaged
Falcon	10	Commander Richard Gwynn	Not engaged
Vulcan	8	Commander William Pettigrew	Fireship, not engaged

=== France ===
Chef d'escadre de la Jonquière's fleet
Ship	Guns	Commander	Notes
Diamant	30	Captain Toussaint Hocquart	Captured
Philibert	30	Captain Jacques Lars de Lescouet	French East India Company ship, captured
Vigilant	20	Captain Pierre Bourau de Vauneulon	FEIC ship, captured
Chiméne	36	Unknown captain	FEIC ship
Rubis	52	Captain Macarty	En flute, captured
Jason	50	Captain Beccart	Captured
Sérieux	64	Chef d'escadre the Marquis de la Jonquière; Captain Charles-Alexandre Morell d'Aubigny	Captured
Invincible	74	Captain Jacques-François Grout de Saint-Georges	Captured
Apollon	30	Captain Noël	FEIC ship, captured
Thétis	22	Captain Masson	FEIC ship, captured
Modeste	18	Captain Thiercelin	FEIC ship, captured
Gloire	40	Captain de Saliez †	Captured
Emeraude	40	Captain Clément de Taffanel de La Jonquière	Not in line of battle
Dartmouth	18	Unknown captain	Not in line of battle, captured

== See also ==
- Second Battle of Cape Finisterre
- Battle of Cape Finisterre (1805)
