= HMS Invincible (1747) =

Ship of the line of the Royal Navy

Coordinates: 50°44′34″N 01°02′23″W

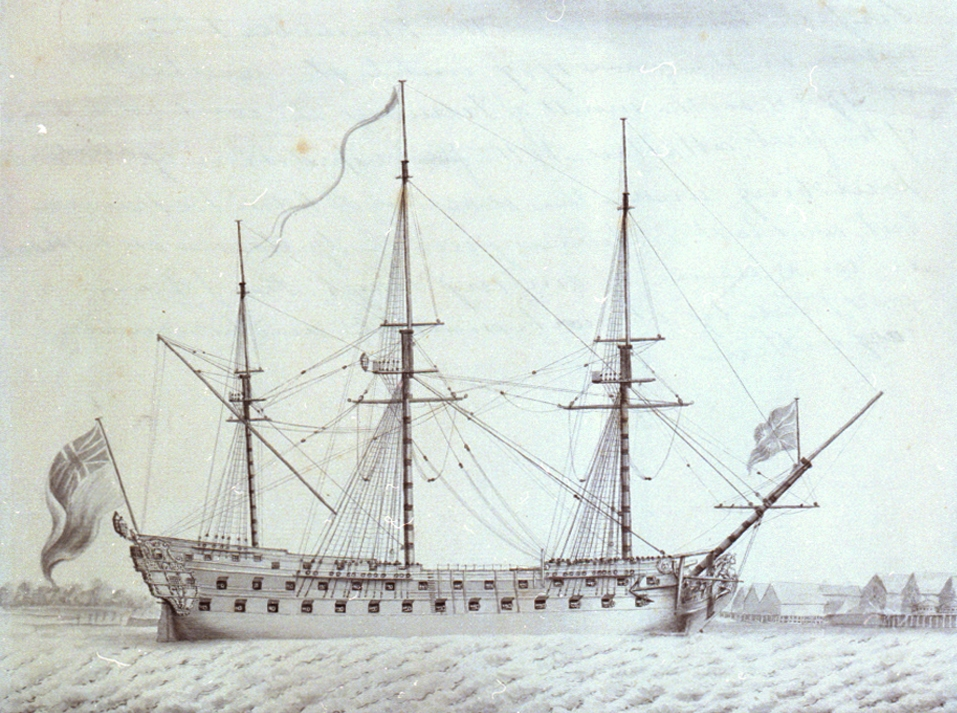
- Invincible

History

France
- Name: Invincible
- Builder: Rochefort
- Laid down: May 1741
- Launched: 21 October 1744
- Captured: 3 May 1747, by Royal Navy
- Notes: Participated in: First Battle of Cape Finisterre

Great Britain
- Name: HMS Invincible
- Acquired: 3 May 1747
- Fate: Wrecked, 1758

General characteristics (as re-measured by the British following her capture)
- Tons burthen: 1,793 tons
- Length: 171 ft 3 in (52.20 m) (gun deck length)
- Beam: 49 ft 3 in (15.01 m)
- Depth of hold: 21 ft 3 in (6.48 m)
- Propulsion: Sails
- Armament: 74 guns of various weights of shot

Invincible was originally a 74-gun ship of the line of the French Navy launched in October 1744. Captured on 14 May 1747, she was taken into Royal Navy service as the third rate HMS Invincible. She was wrecked in 1758 after hitting a sandbank. The wreck is a Protected Wreck managed by Historic England.

== Ship design ==
During the early part of the 18th century British ship designers had made few significant advances in design, whereas French shipbuilding benefited from a remarkably creative period. At the time of the capture of Invincible, there was not one 74-gun ship in the Royal Navy. By 1805 at the Battle of Trafalgar, three quarters of British ships of the line were of this singular design and the 74-gun ship had become the backbone of all major navies of the world.

Invincible was one of the first trio of a new and longer type of 74-gun ships. Until 1738, French 74s had been little more than 154 (French) feet in gundeck length, carrying just thirteen pairs of 36-pounder guns on the lower deck, fourteen pairs of 18-pounder guns on the upper deck and eight pairs of 8-pounder guns on the quarterdeck and forecastle, with the balance of the 74 guns made up of four small 4-pounder guns on the poop.

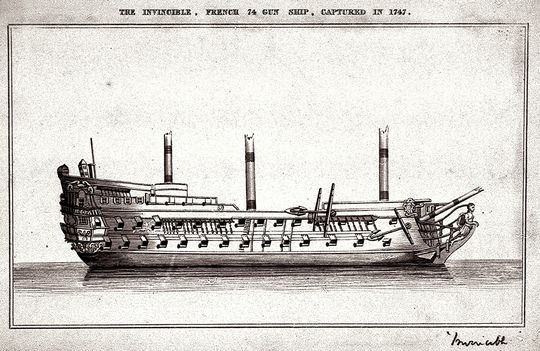
Invincible after her capture

This was changed by François Coulomb's design for Terrible, launched in 1739 at Toulon. The gundeck length was stretched to 164 (French) feet, and the four small guns on the poop were eliminated, replaced by new gunports for an additional pair of 36-pounder guns on the lower deck and an extra pair of 18-pounder guns on the upper deck. This new gun establishment became the standard for all subsequent French 74s. The next two ships, Invincible designed by Pierre Morineau and Le Magnanime designed by Blaise Geslain, were begun in early 1741 at Rochefort and were each even longer than Le Terrible.

== Active service ==
At the First Battle of Cape Finisterre (14 May 1747) during the War of the Austrian Succession, Invincible was escorting a convoy of merchant ships when she was sighted by the British channel fleet of 16 ships of the line, which gave chase. Invincible attacked the British ships to give the convoy a chance to escape, and alone engaged six British warships. In the end with most of her crew dead or wounded she struck her colours. Gracious in defeat, the French Commander, Saint-Georges, handed his sword to Admiral George Anson.

HMS Invincible sank in February 1758 when she hit the Horse Tail Sand sandbank, in the East Solent, between Langstone Harbour and the Isle of Wight. The ship remained upright for 3 days after its grounding allowing the crew to safely escape.

== Wreck site ==
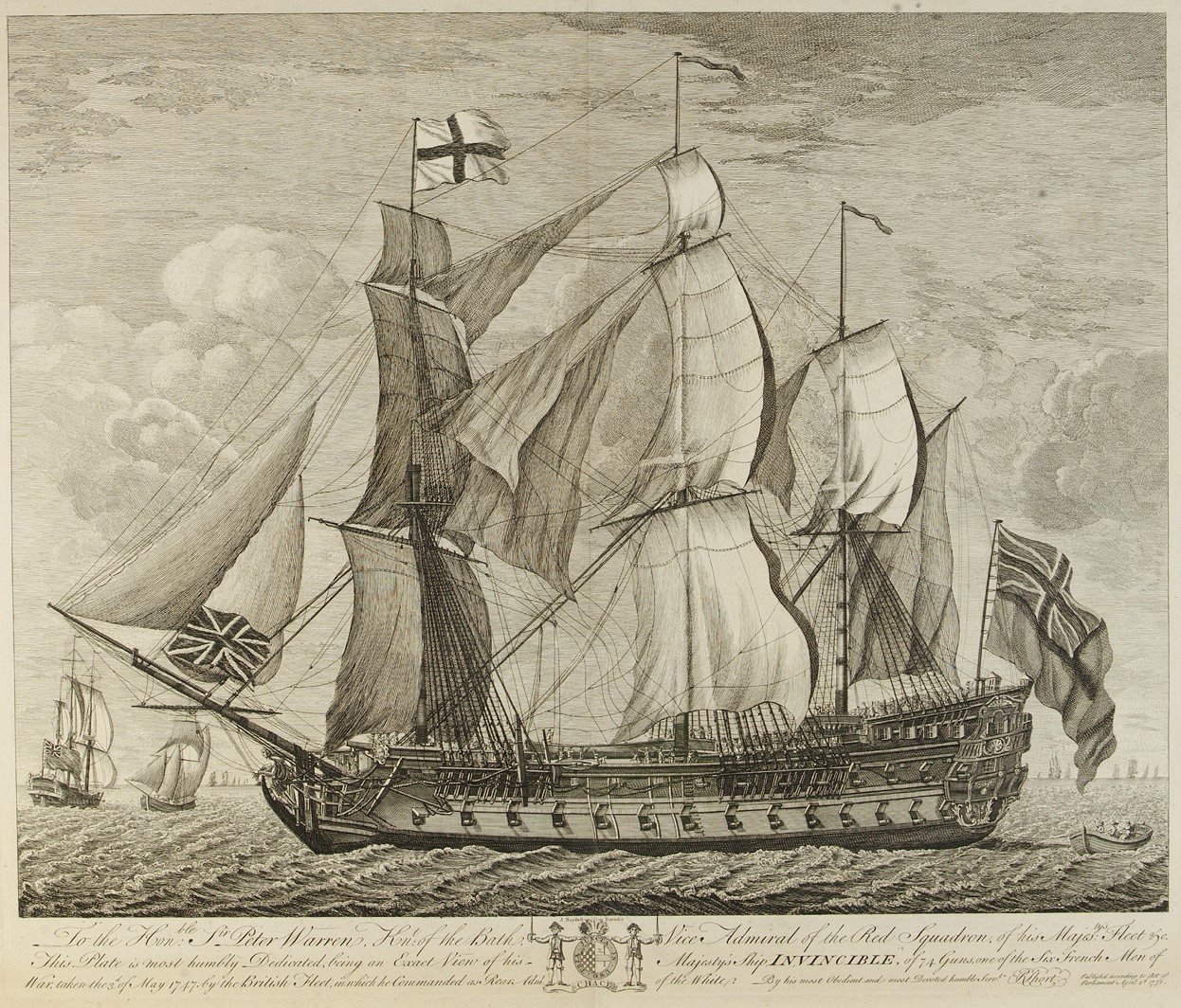
Invincible, of 74 Guns, one of the six French men of war taken 3 May 1747 by the British Fleet. Drawn by Richard Short, engraved by John Boydell

The site of the wreck was rediscovered by a fisherman in 1979 and was designated under the Protection of Wrecks Act on 30 September 1980. In 1996 Amer Ved grounded at the wrecksite, although it is not clear whether or not this resulted in damage to the remains. In 2013, the wreck was placed on Historic England's (then called English Heritage) list of ten most at risk heritage sites due to parts of the ship being exposed by changing seabed levels. In July 2016 it was announced that £2 million of the fines imposed for the Libor banking scandal would be used to fund an excavation of the wreck site. In 2015, Historic England undertook conservation of a number of organic objects, gathered by surface recovery and vulnerable to physical and biological decay, publishing the report in 2018. In 2016, Historic England commissioned Pascoe Archaeology Services to conduct a detailed photogrammetry survey of vulnerable and at-risk areas of the Invincible wreck site.

In 2017, Historic England adopted a Conservation Management Plan for the wreck site.

In December 2019, the BBC was given a preview of some of the 2000 artefacts found at the site, due to go on display to the public in 2020 at Chatham Dockyard as part of a National Museum of the Royal Navy travelling exhibition. These include parts of the ship's hull, tobacco pipes and ceramic hair curlers. Items from the wreck were shown in Episode 2 of Series 7 of the BBC's Digging for Britain series.

In June 2022, the lost rudder of the ship was found intact, 60 metres (200 ft) away from the main shipwreck.

== See also ==
- List of ships captured in the 18th century
- Glossary of nautical terms (A-L)
- Glossary of nautical terms (M-Z)
