= HMS Dorsetshire (1757) =

Ship of the line of the Royal Navy

- Dorsetshire

History

Great Britain
- Name: HMS Dorsetshire
- Ordered: 19 January 1754
- Builder: Chatham Dockyard
- Launched: 13 December 1757
- Fate: Broken up, 1775

General characteristics
- Class & type: 1754 amendments 70-gun third-rate ship of the line
- Tons burthen: 1436
- Length: 162 ft (49.4 m) (gundeck)
- Beam: 44 ft 8 in (13.6 m)
- Depth of hold: 19 ft (5.8 m)
- Propulsion: Sails
- Sail plan: Full-rigged ship
- Armament: 70 guns: Gundeck: 28 × 32 pdrs; Upper gundeck: 28 × 18 pdrs; Quarterdeck: 12 × 9 pdrs; Forecastle: 2 × 9 pdrs

HMS Dorsetshire was a 70-gun third-rate ship of the line of the Royal Navy, built at Chatham Dockyard to the draught specified by the 1745 Establishment, amended in 1754, and launched on 13 December 1757.

At the action of 29 April 1758, Dorsetshire defeated and captured French ship of the line Raisonnable in the Bay of Biscay.

Dorsetshire served until 1775, when she was broken up.
