= French ship Raisonnable =

Eighteenth century naval vessel

- Raisonnable

History

France
- Name: Raisonnable
- Launched: November 1756
- Captured: 29 May 1758, by Royal Navy

Great Britain
- Name: Raisonnable
- Acquired: 29 May 1758
- Fate: Lost, 3 February 1762

General characteristics
- Class & type: 28-gun third-rate ship of the line
- Tons burthen: 1326 80/94 bm
- Length: 159 ft 2 in (48.5 m) (gun deck); 129 ft 7 in (39.5 m) (keel)
- Beam: 43 ft 10 in (13.4 m)
- Depth of hold: 19 ft 6.75 in (5.96 m)
- Sail plan: Full-rigged ship
- Complement: 500
- Armament: 64 guns comprising: Upper deck: 28 × 12-pounder guns; Lower deck: 28 × 12-pounder guns; Quarterdeck: 4 × 6-pounder guns; Forecastle: 4 × 6-pounder guns; 12 × 1/2-pdr swivel guns

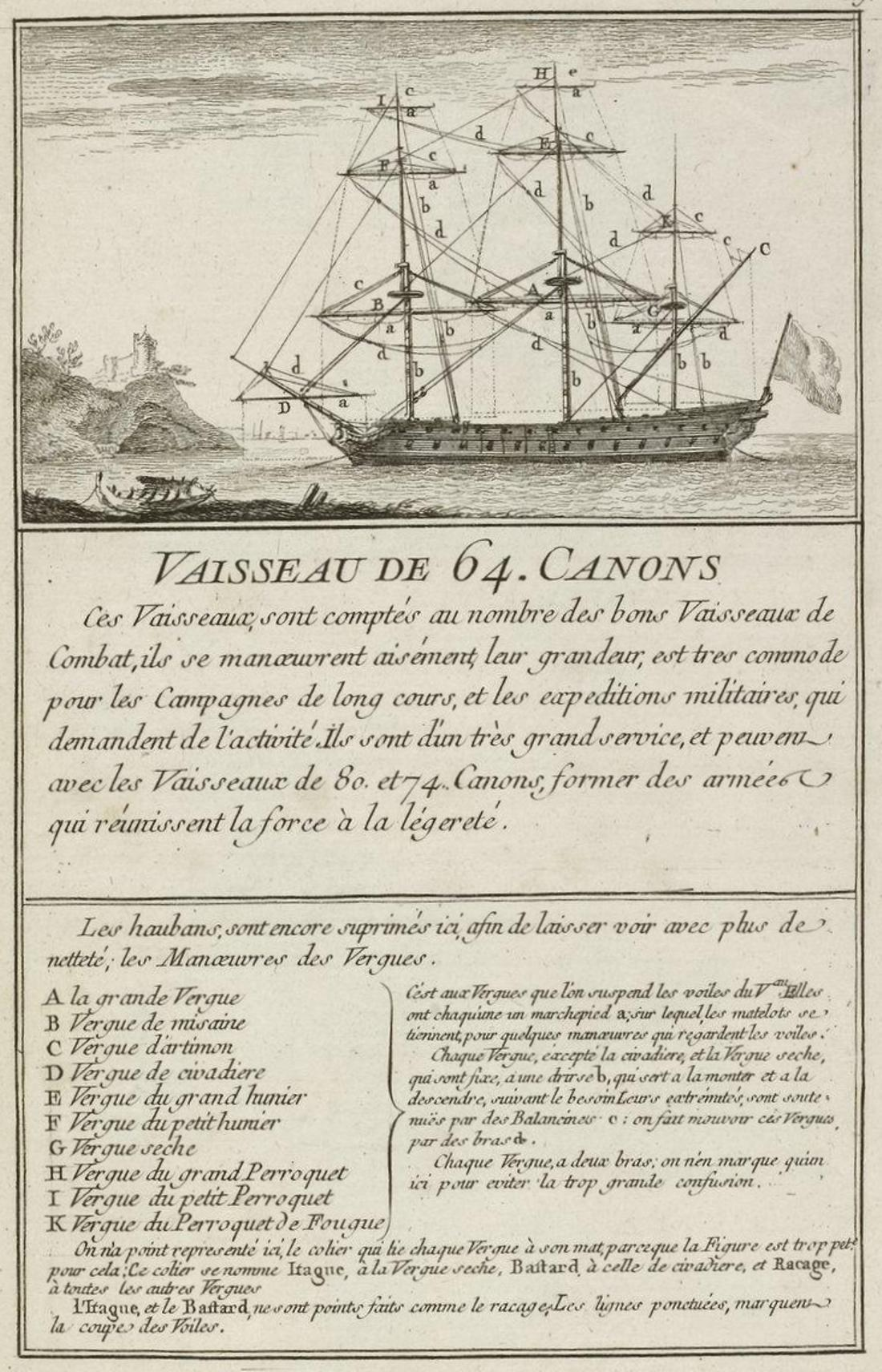
An image of French ship Raisonnable (1755)

Raisonnable was a 64-gun ship of the line of the French Navy, launched in 1755.

On 29 May 1758 she was captured in the Bay of Biscay by HMS Dorsetshire and HMS Achilles at the action of 29 April 1758. Commissioned into the Royal Navy in 1759 under Captain John Montagu, she served in the Leeward Islands until 3 February 1762 when she grounded and was wrecked on a reef off the port of Martinique.

== See also ==
- List of ships captured in the 18th century
