= List of ship launches in 1744 =

The list of ship launches in 1744 includes a chronological list of some ships launched in 1744.

Date	Ship	Class	Builder	Location	Country	Notes
January	L'Insulaire	Frigate	Nicholas Levesque	Port-Louis	(Kingdom of France) Mauritius	For Compagnie des Indes.
17 February	Swallow	Merlin-class sloop	John Buxton	Deptford Dockyard	Great Britain	For Royal Navy.
20 March	Merlin	Merlin-class sloop	Greville & Whetstone	Limehouse	Great Britain	For Royal Navy.
19 April	Hind	Hind-class sloop	Philemon Perry	Blackwall	Great Britain	For Royal Navy.
3 May	Winchester	Fourth rate	Bird	Rotherhithe	Great Britain	For Royal Navy.
4 May	Vulture	Hind-class sloop	John Greaves	Limehouse	Great Britain	For Royal Navy.
11 May	Vigilant	Third rate	Jacques-Luc Coulomb	Brest	Kingdom of France	For French Navy.
13 May	Caribou	Fourth rate	Rene-Nicholas Levasseur	Quebec City	New France	For French Navy.
27 May	Fine	Fifth rate	Pierre Chaillé Fils	Havre de Grâce	Kingdom of France	For French Navy.
31 May	Shoreham	Sixth rate	John Reed	Hull	Great Britain	For Royal Navy.
2 June	Wager	Sixth rate	John Quallett	Rotherhithe	Great Britain	For Royal Navy.
16 June	Mary Galley	Fifth rate	Henry Bird	Rotherhithe	Great Britain	For Royal Navy.
29 June	Pearl	Fifth rate	John Okill	Liverpool	Great Britain	For Royal Navy.
30 June	Lark	Fifth rate	Richard Golightly	Liverpool	Great Britain	For Royal Navy.
1 July	Princess Louisa	Fourth rate	Carter	Limehouse	Great Britain	For Royal Navy.
17 July	Jamaica	Hind-class sloop	Joseph Allin	Deptford	Great Britain	For Royal Navy.
17 July	Trial	Hind-class sloop		Deptford Dockyard	Great Britain	For Royal Navy.
31 July	Ludlow Castle	Fifth rate	James Taylor	Rotherhithe	Great Britain	For Royal Navy.
14 August	Colchester	Fourth rate	Barnard	Harwich	Great Britain	For Royal Navy.
14 August	Fowey	Fifth rate	Blaydes	Hull	Great Britain	For Royal Navy.
August	Emeraude	Frigate	Pierre Chaillé Fils	Havre de Grâce	Kingdom of France	For French Navy.
11 October	Portland	Fourth rate	Snellgrove	Limehouse	Great Britain	For Royal Navy.
12 October	Defiance	Fourth rate	West	Deptford	Great Britain	For Royal Navy.
12 October	Maidstone	Fourth rate	Wells	Rotherhithe	Great Britain	For Royal Navy.
13 October	Bridgewater	Sixth rate	George Rowcliffe	Northam	Great Britain	For Royal Navy.
21 October	Invincible	Third rate	Pierre Morineau	Rochefort	Kingdom of France	For French Navy.
30 October	Oriflamme	Ship of the line	Pierre-Blaise Coulomb	Toulon	Kingdom of France	For French Navy.
9 November	Speedwell	Merlin-class sloop	John Buxton	Deptford	Great Britain	For Royal Navy.
12 November	Falcon	Merlin-class sloop	John Barnard	location	Great Britain	For Royal Navy.
22 November	Magnanime	Third rate	Blaise Geslain	Rochefort	Kingdom of France	For French Navy.
11 December	Hazard	Merlin-class sloop	John Buxton, Sr.	Rotherhithe	Great Britain	For Royal Navy.
Unknown date	Ambitieuse	France-class galley	Jean Reynoir	Marseille	Kingdom of France	For French Navy.
Unknown date	København	Third rate			Denmark–Norway	For Dano-Norwegian Navy.
Unknown date	Le Grand Turque	Full-rigged ship		Saint-Malo	Kingdom of France	For Private owner.
Unknown date	Le Lis	Privateer		Saint-Malo	Kingdom of France	For private owner
Unknown date	Singe	Catboat		Rochefort	Kingdom of France	For French Navy.
Unknown date	Tigre	Catboat		Rochefort	Kingdom of France	For French Navy.
