= List of ship launches in 1745 =

The list of ship launches in 1745 includes a chronological list of some ships launched in 1745.

Date	Ship	Class	Builder	Location	Country	Notes
January	Bellone	Privateer		Nantes	Kingdom of France	For private owner.
26 February	Advice	Fourth rate	Rowcliffe	Southampton	Great Britain	For Royal Navy.
8 March	Hinchinbrooke	Merlin-class sloop	Moody Janverin	Bursledon	Great Britain	For Royal Navy.
8 March	Yarmouth	Third rate		Deptford Dockyard	Great Britain	For Royal Navy.
19 March	Embuscade	Fifth rate		Havre de Grâce	Kingdom of France	For French Navy.
22 March	Tavistock	Merlin-class sloop	Jacob Ackworth	Gosport	Great Britain	For Royal Navy.
23 March	Gloucester	Fourth rate	Whetstone & Grenville	Rotherhithe	Great Britain	For Royal Navy.
April	Palme	Palme-class corvette	Joseph-Louis Ollivier	Brest	Kingdom of France	For French Navy.
22 May	Glasgow	Sixth rate	John Reed	Hull	Great Britain	For Royal Navy.
22 May	Hound	Merlin-class sloop	Jacob Ackworth	Shoreham-by-Sea	Great Britain	For Royal Navy.
22 May	Weazel	Ship-sloop	James Taylor & John Randall	Rotherhithe	Great Britain	For Royal Navy.
5 June	Poole	Fifth rate	Hugh Blaydes	Hull	Great Britain	For Royal Navy.
4 July	Norwich	Fourth rate	Perry	Blackwall Yard	Great Britain	For Royal Navy.
4 July	Raven	Merlin-class sloop	Hugh Blaydes	Hull	Great Britain	For Royal Navy.
19 July	Devonshire	Third rate		Woolwich Dockyard	Great Britain	For Royal Navy.
20 July	Tilbury	Fourth rate		Portsmouth Dockyard	Great Britain	For Royal Navy.
24 July	Sant Ignazio	San Lorenzo Justinian-class ship of the line		Venice	Republic of Venice	For Venetian Navy.
3 August	Hornet	Merlin-class sloop	John Quallett	West Itchenor	Great Britain	For Royal Navy.
3 August	Ruby	Fourth rate	Ewer	Bursledon	Great Britain	For Royal Navy.
5 August	Badger	Merlin-class sloop	Moody Janverin	Bursledon	Great Britain	For Royal Navy.
10 August	Southsea Castle	Fifth rate	John Okill	Liverpool	Great Britain	For Royal Navy.
17 August	Looe	Fifth rate	John Gorill	Liverpool	Great Britain	For Royal Navy.
17 August	Triton	Sixth rate	Richard Heather	Bursledon	Great Britain	For Royal Navy.
2 September	Prince Edward	Fifth rate	Henry Bird	Rotherhithe	Great Britain	For Royal Navy.
3 September	Siren	Sixth rate	Thomas Snelgrove	Limehouse	Great Britain	For Royal Navy.
13 October	Mercury	Sixth rate	Richard Golightly	Liverpool	Great Britain	For Royal Navy.
17 October	Bombay Merchant	East Indiaman	Abraham Wells	Deptford	Great Britain	For private owner.
31 October	Chesterfield	Fifth rate	John Quallett	Rotherhithe	Great Britain	For Royal Navy.
October	Faulkner	Packet ship		Deptford	Great Britain	For private owner.
13 November	Countess of Leicester	Packet ship		Deptford	Great Britain	For private owner.
30 November	Falcon	Merlin-class sloop	Jacob Ackworth	Rotherhithe	Great Britain	For Royal Navy.
1 December	Fier	Ship of the line		Toulon	Kingdom of France	For French Navy.
2 December	Eagle	Fourth rate	John Barnard	Harwich	Great Britain	For Royal Navy.
12 December	Kingfisher	Sloop of war	John Darley	Gosport	Great Britain	For Royal Navy.
14 December	Swallow	Merlin-class sloop	Henry Bird	Rotherhithe	Great Britain	For Royal Navy.
14 December	Swan	Merlin-class sloop	Thomas Hinks	Chester	Great Britain	For Royal Navy.
30 December	Dispatch	Merlin-class sloop	Stone & Barlett	Shoreham-by-Sea	Great Britain	For Royal Navy.
Unknown date	Ilchester	East Indiaman			Great Britain	For Private owner.
Unknown date	Arc en Ciel	Fourth rate	Pierre Morineau	Bayonne	Kingdom of France	For French Navy.
Unknown date	Le Grand Grenot	Privateer		Granville, Manche	Kingdom of France	For Léonor-François Couraye du Parc.
Unknown date	Les Deux Couronnes	Frigate		Saint-Malo	Kingdom of France	For Le Feur du Fachet.
Unknown date	Nouvel Eugène	Slave ship		New England	Thirteen Colonies	For private owner.
Unknown date	Sandwich	East Indiaman			Great Britain	For Private owners.
Unknown date	San Felipe	Third rate	Augustin Salomon	Guarnizo	Spain	For Spanish Navy.
Unknown date	Schiedam	Fourth rate	Paulus van Zwijndrecht	Rotterdam	Dutch Republic	For Dutch Navy.
