= HMS Swallow (1745) =

Royal Navy sloop

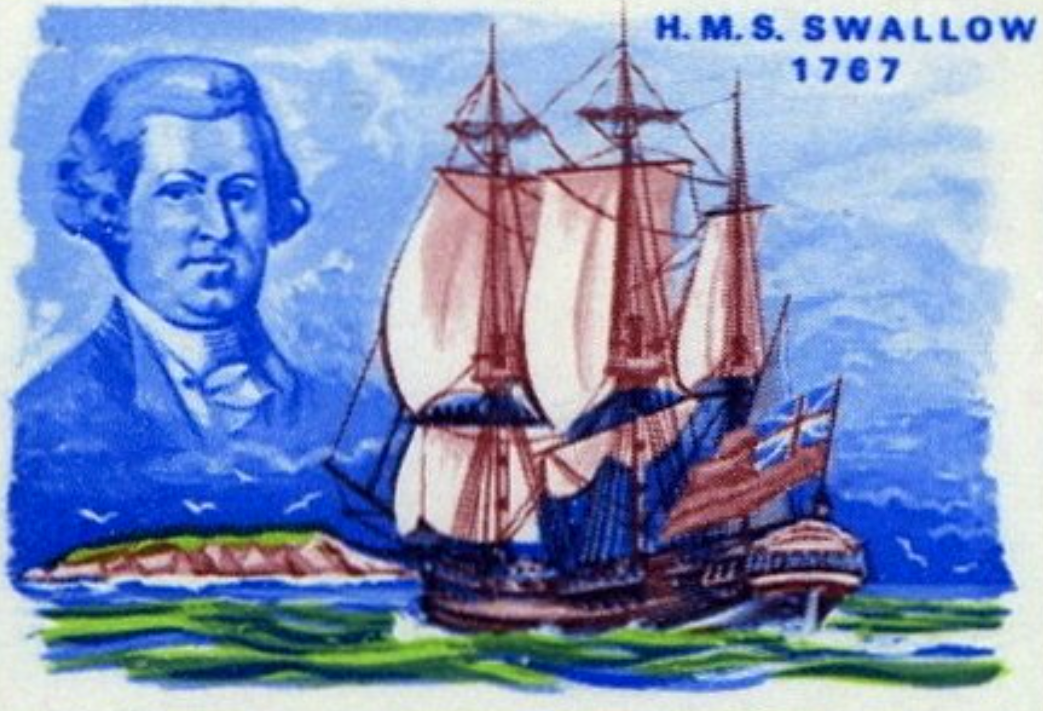
- Philip Carteret and Swallow at Pitcairn, 1767, from a 1967 stamp

History

Great Britain
- Name: HMS Swallow
- Ordered: 5 April 1745
- Builder: Henry Bird, Rotherhithe
- Cost: £4,224
- Laid down: May 1745
- Launched: 14 December 1745
- Completed: 12 February 1746
- Commissioned: December 1745
- Fate: Sold 20 June 1769

General characteristics
- Class & type: Merlin-class sloop
- Tons burthen: 27813/94 (bm)
- Length: Gundeck: 91 ft 10 1/2 in (28.0 m); Keel: 75 ft 7 3/4 in (23.1 m)
- Beam: 26 ft 3 1/2 in (8 m)
- Depth of hold: 6 ft 10 1/4 in (2.1 m)
- Propulsion: Sails
- Complement: 110 (125 from 1748)
- Armament: 10 × 6-pounder guns (14 from 1748) + 14 × ½-pounder swivels

HMS Swallow was a 14-gun Merlin-class sloop of the Royal Navy. Commissioned in 1745, she initially served in home waters as a convoy escort and cruiser before sailing to join the East Indies Station in 1747. There she served in the squadron of Rear-Admiral Edward Boscawen, taking part in an aborted invasion of Mauritius and the Siege of Pondicherry. In 1755 Swallow returned home to join the Downs Station, as part of which she fought at the Raid on St Malo, Raid on Cherbourg, and Battle of Saint Cast in 1758. She was also present when the French fleet broke out of Brest prior to the Battle of Quiberon Bay in 1759.

Swallow was converted into an exploration ship in 1766, and she sailed under Philip Carteret as part of an expedition to the Pacific Ocean. Split from her companion vessel when the expedition reached Cape Pillar off Desolación Island in Chile, Carteret continued on with Swallow despite the ship not being fully equipped for a solo voyage. Sailing on a north-west course, Swallow went on to discover the Pitcairn Islands and New Ireland while battling a lack of supplies and severe bouts of sickness. The ship reached Batavia towards the end of 1767, where she underwent a refit. Swallow returned to England in early 1769, and was sold later that year.

== Design and construction ==
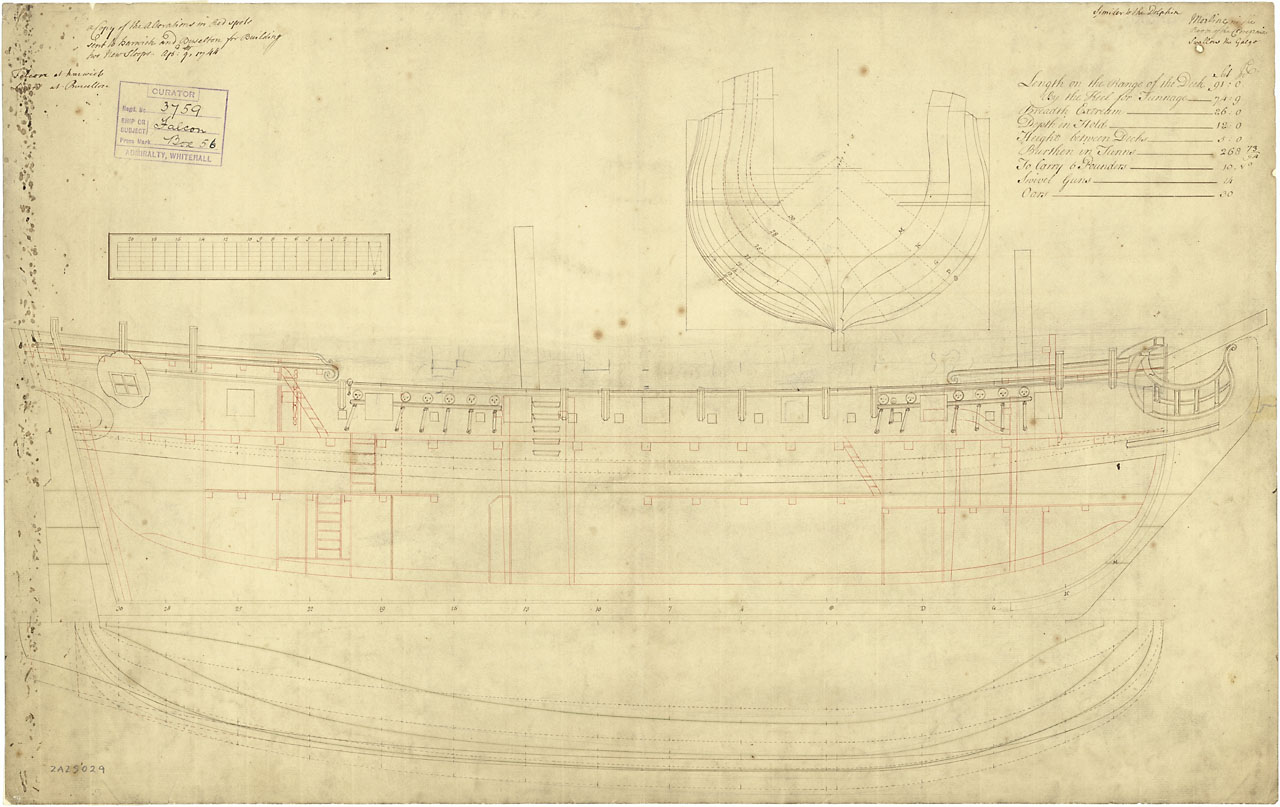
Construction plan of Swallow in the National Maritime Museum, Greenwich

Swallow was a 6-pounder, Merlin-class sloop. Her class was designed by the shipwright Jacob Acworth in 1743 as a more heavily gunned variant of sloop to replace earlier classes, such as the Baltimore-class sloop, that were armed with 4-pounders. The Merlin class was the first class of sloop to be armed with 6-pounders. The original order of ships for the class saw only two sloops constructed, HMS Swallow and HMS Merlin. While they were established as 10-gun vessels, they were actually built with 7 gun ports on each side, providing them with the capability to hold a larger armament. The large majority of the vessels were rigged as snows. The design became the standard for the Admiralty, and between 1744 and 1746 a further nineteen sloops were ordered to the Merlin class. It is possible that some of the class were actually built to the design of the Hind-class sloop, another class designed in 1743, but the dimensions of the sloops suggests that the basis of their construction was the Merlin class. The sloops were the largest single-design class of ship in the Royal Navy when they were procured, and continued to be so until the advent of the Swan-class ship-sloop in the 1770s.

The first Swallow of the Merlin class was wrecked in the Bahamas in December 1744, and another ship of the class was given the same name to replace her. With all ships of the class constructed by civilian shipyards, this new Swallow was contracted out to Henry Bird of Rotherhithe on 5 April 1745. She was laid down in May, named on 11 December, and launched on 14 December with the following dimensions: 91 feet 10 1/2 inches (28.0 m) along the upper deck, 75 feet 7 3/4 inches (23.1 m) at the keel, with a beam of 26 feet 3 1/2 inches (8 m) and a depth in the hold of 6 feet 10 1/4 inches (2.1 m). The first two ships of the class had been fitted with a platform in their hold which severely decreased the depth of their holds, but this feature had been discontinued in most of their successors. However Swallow and another sloop of the class, HMS Raven, had a much shallower depth in the hold than their compatriots, suggesting that they too were fitted with this platform. She measured 278 13/94 tons burthen. (Note: The class was nominally ordered at 268 tons burthen.)

Swallow was fitted out at Deptford Dockyard, being completed on 12 February 1746. She carried ten 6-pounder guns and fourteen half-pounder swivel guns, but in 1748 the extra gun ports each ship had been built with were utilised, with four more 6-pounders being added to her armament. Reflecting this increase in the number of guns needing to be served, her crew number was increased at the same time from 110 to 125. In 1755 she was converted from a sloop into a ship-sloop alongside HMS Swan, following the previous conversions of Raven, HMS Saltash, HMS Tavistock, and HMS Trial. This added a third mast to Swallow, providing her with heightened mobility and stability. (Note: These conversions were the precursor to the Royal Navy adopting purpose-built ship-sloops.)

== Service ==
=== East Indies Station ===
Swallow was commissioned by Commander John Rowzier in December 1745. She was initially tasked with cruising, and with protecting local convoys. She arrived at Hamburg with a convoy of merchantmen from Hull in the same month, but was subsequently forced to stay in the port for four weeks because changing winds stopped her from leaving; she finally returned to England on 7 January 1746. In November 1747 she was sent to serve on the East Indies Station. While on station there, Rowzier was replaced by Commander Richard Clements towards the start of 1748. Intending to capture Mauritius from the French, Rear-Admiral Edward Boscawen sailed with his squadron, Swallow included, from the Cape of Good Hope on 8 May. The squadron reached its destination on 23 June. The ships anchored for the night in the nearby Turtle Bay. On the next day they were fired upon by a number of French coastal gun batteries which would need to be destroyed before the invasion could take place.

The 60-gun fourth-rate HMS Pembroke was then sent to give covering fire to Swallow and the 44-gun frigate HMS Eltham as they sailed along the coast. The plan was to reconnoitre the coastline to find weaknesses and suitable landing points, but as the ships neared the French they were fired upon by eight batteries and discovered that the main harbour was defended by a large warship, with thirteen more ships within. Small boats were sent in along the coast to check for other weaknesses in the French defences, but it was decided that any invasion would come at too high a cost. The squadron left for the Coromandel Coast on 26 June and arrived at Fort St. David on 29 July.

Boscawen then decided that an attack on Pondicherry should be made. Swallow was sent with Pembroke and the 50-gun fourth-rate HMS Chester to join the 58-gun fourth-rate Exeter off Pondicherry on 3 August, where they were tasked with mapping out the area ready for invasion and blockading the town. The army began their attack on 8 August and Clements vacated his post in Swallow on 29 September, upon his promotion to post-captain, while this was still ongoing. By 30 September little progress had been made despite the assistance of frequent bombardments of the defences by the squadron, and with the monsoon season approaching the invasion was abandoned. The army began its march back to Fort St. David on 6 October.

Commander Andrew Cockburn arrived as the replacement for Clements on 9 October. While sailing off the Coromandel Coast on 14 April 1749 Swallow was dismasted in a large storm, but despite this she managed to reach Fort St. David after it had ended. On 1 September Cockburn and Commander Henry Speke switched commands, and the latter commanded Swallow until 22 January 1753, when she was paid off (ending Swallow's current commission). The ship was surveyed on 12 April but stayed in ordinary (a form of mothballing) until June 1755 when she was sent to Deptford for a repair, and to be converted into a ship-sloop. This work cost £3,370 and was completed in November of the same year. While undergoing her conversion Swallow was recommissioned by Commander Henry Angel on 24 July, and she afterwards joined the Downs Station.

=== Downs Station and Western Squadron ===
In late February 1756 Swallow was at Sheerness Dockyard when seven of her crew stole her yawl and deserted; they were seen in Hollesley Bay on 21 February but successfully escaped a Customs sloop by beaching the yawl and running inland. On 23 August Angel was promoted to post-captain and replaced by Commander John Lendrick, and the ship was sent orders to go cruising. In doing so she captured the French 10-gun privateer Le Faucon on 4 May 1757 while in company with the 8-gun sloop HMS Cruizer and the armed cutter Hazard. Swallow subsequently fought at the Raid on St Malo in June 1758, the Raid on Cherbourg in the following August, and the Battle of Saint Cast in September, only the latter of which was unsuccessful. Lendrick left Swallow on 11 September and on 3 January 1759 Commander Francis Banks assumed command of the ship. Swallow was subsequently tasked with protecting convoys of supply ships that were being sent out to Admiral Sir Edward Hawke's fleet off Brest. On 15 November she sighted the French fleet of the Comte de Conflans as it escaped from Brest on its way to its encounter with Hawke at the Battle of Quiberon Bay on 20 November.

Swallow continued under Banks until 14 April 1760 when he was promoted to post-captain and replaced by Lieutenant Charles Feilding, and the ship then joined the Western Squadron based out of Plymouth Dockyard. Feilding handed over to Commander James Cranston on 27 August, and under him Swallow captured the French 4-gun privateer Le Vautour on 9 January 1761 while in company with the 28-gun frigate HMS Aquilon. Beginning a run of prizetaking, Swallow then captured the letter of marque Le Tigre on 12 February, having been sent to cruise off Oléron. Some time in mid-February Cranston began to intermittently be replaced in command of Swallow by Lieutenant Robert Brice, who captured the 10-gun privateer snow Le Sultan off Bayonne on 28 February.

In March, and with Cranston in command, Swallow was readying to leave port to patrol the English Channel when her crew refused to raise her anchor, demanding "Money, money". Cranston threatened to hang the mutineers, and eventually succeeded in getting the crew to raise anchor after the ringleaders were removed. While it was agreed that the majority of the crew had been part of the action, only six men were brought to court martial. Two were sentenced to be hanged, but the executions were commuted after it was discovered that they had been encouraged in their actions by Swallow's boatswain. The naval historian Brian Lavery argues that because of this, the event cannot be described as a true "general mutiny". On 3 July Brice was promoted to commander, assuming full command of Swallow and staying in her until he left to command the 8-gun bomb vessel HMS Basilisk on 19 October; he was replaced by Commander James Mackenzie on 7 April 1762. On 1 May Swallow was the lead escort to the ship that conveyed Lord Halifax, the Lord Lieutenant of Ireland, from Dublin to Parkgate in Cheshire. Swallow served under Mackenzie until after the Seven Years' War ended, when she was paid off on 24 May 1763.

=== Exploration ship ===
==== Outward journey ====
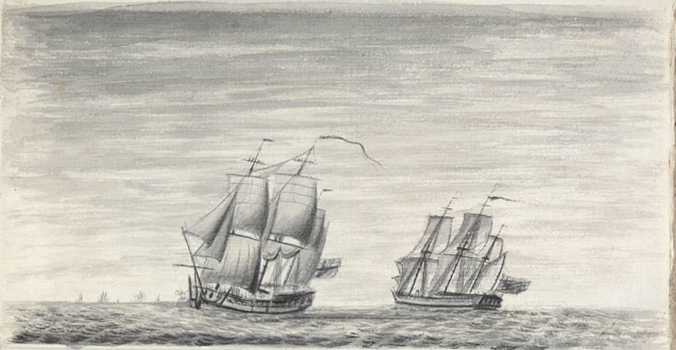
HMS Dolphin and HMS Swallow, by Samuel Wallis, c. 1767

The ship was surveyed on 17 August 1763 and subsequently received a small repair at Chatham Dockyard between February and August 1766, at the cost of £3,915. On 1 July she was recommissioned by Commander Philip Carteret as an exploration ship for the Pacific Ocean. The expedition, commanded by Captain Samuel Wallis in the 24-gun frigate HMS Dolphin, was setting out to better John Byron's earlier attempt, which Carteret had been a part of and which had discovered nothing. Swallow was chosen as a consort ship for Dolphin at short notice because the return of the 16-gun sloop HMS Tamar, Dolphin's expected consort, had been delayed because she was undergoing repairs in the West Indies. When Carteret first arrived onboard Swallow, he considered the ship to be unfit for the expedition and asked for alterations to be made, but many of these were refused. Carteret wrote in his journal that the ship was "one of the worst, if not the very worst, of her kind; in his majesty's Navy, and was in every respects, but indifferently fitted out." The ship was much slower than Dolphin, and George Robertson, her master, called her "poor Dull Swall" and stated she could only sail two feet for every three Dolphin sailed.

The two ships sailed for the Pacific on 21 August, but the working relationship between Carteret and Wallis had already begun to break down, and Wallis initially refused to tell Swallow's captain about their exploration plans, leaving him for three weeks to believe that they were tasked with re-provisioning Port Egmont in the Falkland Islands instead. The ships reached Madeira, with Swallow already holding up the pace of Dolphin. There, eight of Swallow's crew swam ashore to find liquor, having left most of their clothes onboard the ship. Upon returning they were accused of desertion, but Carteret pardoned them, saying that "the failings of brave men should be treated with kindness". Swallow and Dolphin reached Cape Virgenes on 16 December, where they recorded the height of the native Patagonians who were thought to be abnormally tall. At Cape Virgenes the store ship Prince Frederick, which had been sailing in company with the expedition, left to go to Port Egmont, having provided further supplies for the other two ships.

On 17 December the expedition began its journey through the Strait of Magellan, with Swallow tasked to lead the two vessels through the difficult geography of the strait despite her lack of manoeuvrability. After ten days, with Swallow often having to be towed by her small boats, the ships reached Port Famine on 27 December and began a refit. They stayed at the port for three weeks, giving Carteret time to make temporary modifications to Swallow, including lengthening her rudder, hoping to improve her performance. Swallow and Dolphin left Port Famine on 18 January 1767 with the former still in the lead. Friction between Carteret and Wallis continued to grow as Carteret attempted to have Swallow replaced as the lead vessel, his modifications not having done much to improve her. Frequent stops in ports along the way combined with the necessity to often tow Swallow meant that the expedition only reached the western end of the strait, Cape Pilar, on 11 April. (Note: In comparison, Francis Drake had made the same journey in seventeen days.) In the night of 10–11 April, as the two ships finally approached Cape Pilar, Dolphin passed Swallow and continued on, sailing out of sight by 9 am. Swallow was unable to catch up with her consort and did not see her again on the voyage. (Note: The two captains disagreed over why Swallow and Dolphin were separated at this point. Wallis argued that he was forced to continue without Swallow because increasingly bad weather stopped him from turning back, while Carteret believed that Dolphin had abandoned the slow-sailing Swallow as soon as her usefulness within the straits had come to an end.)

==== Exploration ====
Swallow had been serving as a tender for Dolphin and had few supplies of her own on board, and no rendezvous had been agreed upon for if the ships lost each other. With the wind against her, it took her four days to follow Dolphin into open seas. Carteret then made the decision to continue exploring on his own despite the failings of his vessel. Swallow first sailed to the Juan Fernández Islands, expecting that there the crew would be able to prepare the ship for further exploration. Upon arriving there on 10 May Carteret discovered that the previously deserted location had been garrisoned by the Spanish without Britain's knowledge. Unable to refit there, Swallow instead went to Masafuera where she succeeded in watering only after a struggle, as the island lacked a safe landing point. Conditions continued to deteriorate through Swallow's two-week stay at Masafuera, and she left the island on 31 May.

Carteret planned to go in search of Davis Land, a phantom island, on a path that would have taken Swallow to New Zealand, but the winds did not allow it and they were forced northwards before beginning to sail west. Carteret discovered an island on 2 July, which he named Pitcairn after the midshipman who first spotted it. Carteret described it as "scarce better than a large rock in the ocean". By August the crew had begun to be beset by scurvy and Carteret set out to look for a safe haven to rest; they reached Santa Cruz Island, but only managed to get water onboard before they were forced away by attacks from the native islanders who were upset by the crew cutting down sacred trees. Four men injured in the skirmish later died of tetanus. Having failed to replenish themselves, the crew was increasingly sickly (including Carteret) and Swallow continued to deteriorate.

Having sailed from Santa Cruz, Carteret ignored his junior officer's requests to sail straight for Batavia and instead chose a more westerly course in the hope of continuing his explorations. Swallow arrived at the outskirts of the Solomon Islands on 20 August, but Carteret did not recognise them and was put off landing by the hostility of natives on shore. Continuing parallel with the islands, on 28 August the ship reached New Britain, where Carteret named its northern part New Ireland and the channel between the two, St. George's Channel. At New Britain Swallow was careened and fruit was found for the scurvy sufferers. Carteret sailed on 9 September, intending to make contact with Mindanao, but the locals there warned off Swallow's landing boat with two large cannon and then chased the ship in three boats.

==== Return journey ====
With forty members of his crew unable to work the ship, Carteret headed for Batavia. They arrived at the Dutch port of Makassar on 15 December where the Dutch refused the crew provisions, because of a fear that such an action would upset the local power balance. Angered by this, Carteret brought the Dutch officials on board Swallow to show them the condition of his ship and crew, and then threatened that if they did not help him then he would run Swallow aground in their port. The Dutch offered Carteret the use of the small harbour of Bonthain further down the coast, where Swallow restocked and stayed from 21 December 1767 to 22 May 1768. They then sailed to Batavia, reaching the town on 3 June and departing on 25 September after further disagreements with the Dutch authorities, whose opinions of Carteret had already been soured by his behaviour at Makassar. Swallow then travelled briefly to Java for some more provisions, and was then able to sail for England.

On her journey home Swallow stopped at Cape Town, Saint Helena, and Ascension Island. Having left Ascension, on 19 February 1769 Swallow was met by the French circumnavigator Louis Antoine de Bougainville, who had been following the path of the British expedition. Bougainville was sailing in secrecy, and pretended to Carteret that he was from the French East India Company; the British did not discover that the French ship had actually been a rival until much later when comparing their notes. Swallow's deficiencies were also clear to the Frenchman as he passed her, with Bougainville later writing that "[Swallow] was very small, went very ill, and when we took leave of [Carteret], he remained as it were at anchor. How much he must have suffered in so bad a vessel, may well be conceived".

Swallow arrived at Spithead on 20 March, ten months after Dolphin's return. The naval historian Bernard Ireland has compared Swallow's voyage positively to Dolphin's, saying that while Wallis "proved a timid explorer...Carteret showed more mettle". The historian Derek Wilson argues that Swallow's voyage was still unfortunate, with Carteret's wish to sail unknown (and often uninhabited) waters meaning that the ship missed several opportunities for replenishment and to discover Tahiti, as Dolphin did on a more northerly course. Swallow was paid off on 12 April of the year of her return, and sold at Deptford on 20 June for £545.

== Prizes ==
Vessels captured or destroyed for which Swallow's crew received full or partial credit
Date	Ship	Nationality	Type	Fate	Ref.
4 May 1757	Le Faucon	French	10-gun privateer	Captured	
9 January 1761	Le Vautour	French	4-gun privateer	Captured	
12 February 1761	Le Tigre	French	Letter of marque	Captured	
28 February 1761	Le Sultan	French	10-gun privateer snow	Captured	

== See also ==
- Hannah Snell
