= HMS Scorpion =

Eleven ships of the Royal Navy have been named HMS Scorpion after the carnivorous arthropod, or the scorpion, a ballistic weapon in use in the Roman army:

- HMS Scorpion (1746) was a 14-gun Merlin-class sloop launched in 1746. She sank in the Irish Sea in 1762.
- HMS Scorpion (1771), originally the merchant ship Borryan, purchased in January 1771, and commissioned as the 8-gun fireship HMS Etna. She was converted to a sloop in August 1771 and renamed Scorpion, taking part in Tryon's raid in Connecticut in 1779. She subsequently became one of the British prison ships on the Hudson River. Scorpion was sold in 1780.
- HMS Scorpion (1785) was a 16-gun Echo-class sloop launched in 1785 and sold in 1802. She apparently became the whaler and letter of marque Scorpion. She worked in the South Seas whale fishery until the Spaniards captured her in 1808.
- HMS Scorpion (1794) was a gunvessel purchased in 1794 and sold in 1804
- HMS Scorpion (1803) was a Cruizer-class brig-sloop launched in 1803 and sold in 1819.
- HMS Scorpion (1832) was a Cherokee-class brig-sloop launched in 1832, converted to a survey vessel in 1848 and on loan to the Thames Police from 1858. She was broken up in 1874.
- HMS Scorpion (1863) was a turret ship, one of two being constructed for the Confederate States of America under the cover story that they were intended for Egypt; the British Government seized them before they were launched in 1863. Scorpion sank in 1903 while being towed for scrapping.
- HMS Scorpion (1910) was a Beagle-class destroyer launched in 1910 and sold for scrapping in 1921.
- HMS Scorpion (T67) was a river gunboat launched in 1937 and sunk by Japanese destroyers in Banka Strait in 1942.
- HMS Scorpion (G72) was an S-class destroyer launched in 1942 and sold to the Netherlands in 1945.
- HMS Scorpion (D64) was a Weapon-class destroyer launched in 1946 and scrapped in 1971.
