= Hannah Snell =

British soldier, performer and businesswoman (1723–1792)

- c. 1750 portrait
- Born: 23 April 1723; Worcester, England
- Died: 8 February 1792 (aged 68); London, England
- Resting place: Old Burial Ground, Royal Hospital Chelsea
- Military career
- Allegiance: Great Britain
- Branch: British Army
- Service years: 1745–1750
- Rank: Private
- Unit: John Guise's Regiment of Foot
- Conflicts: War of the Austrian Succession; First Carnatic War

Hannah Snell (23 April 1723 – 8 February 1792) was a British soldier, writer and businesswoman who disguised herself as a man to join the British Army.

== Early life ==
Hannah Snell was born in Worcester, England on 23 April 1723. She was the youngest daughter of the family, with eight siblings. Her father Samuel Snell was a hosier and dyer. Due to Snell's grandfather’s service in the military and the money that they inherited from him, her father and his second wife, Mary Williams, were wealthy enough to live comfortably and provide adequate education for all their children. In spite of this, Snell learned to read but never learned to write. She was referred to as the "young Amazon Snell" by locals and she often played soldier as a child.

Snell’s parents died when she was 17. She moved to London on 25 December 1740 to live with her older sibling, Susanah, in her house in Wapping. She married James Summs, a Dutch seaman, on 18 January 1744. Summs often sought the company of other women and grew to despise Snell. He used her patrimony to pay for his luxurious lifestyle. They quickly fell into debt and became impoverished. Summs abandoned Snell when she was pregnant with their child, Susanna, who died in infancy.

Snell moved back in with her sibling Susannah and her brother-in-law, James Gray. On 23 November 1745, Snell put on her brother-in-law's clothes, assumed his name, and went to Coventry to search for Summs. Later, she learned that her husband had been executed for murder. While in Coventry, she enlisted in the British Army, joining John Guise's Regiment of Foot, which was ranked as the 6th Regiment of Foot.

== Military career ==
Hannah Snell joined the military when she was 25 years old under her brother-in-law's identity, James Gray. She joined the regiment of general John Guise in 1747, where she received training in military exercises and greatly excelled. During this time, she had a falling out with a sergeant in her regiment named Davis who accused Gray of neglecting her duties. This incident was prompted due to Gray's refusal to facilitate a sexual encounter between Davis and a local woman. For this accused neglect, Gray was sentenced to “600 lashes" and received 500 while tied to the gate of Carlisle Castle. In Robert Walker's biography on her life, it is mentioned that she eluded discovery due to the manner in which her arms were tied to the gate as well as the small size of her breasts.

After these events, Snell deserted and went to join a marine regiment. She boarded the Merlin-class sloop HMS Swallow at Portsmouth and sailed as a cabin boy under commander John Rowzier to Lisbon. Her unit was to invade French Mauritius as part of the War of the Austrian Succession, but the attack was called off. Her unit then sailed to India to take part in the First Carnatic War. In August 1748, her unit was sent to an unsuccessful expedition to besiege the French colony of Pondicherry in India. Later, she fought in a battle at Devicottah in June 1749. She was injured a total of 11 times, with one shot in her groin and five in her leg. After the battle, she was sent to a hospital at Cuddalore, where she was seen by two physicians. To avoid revealing her sex, she either removed the bullet herself or was assisted by a local woman, instead of being tended by the regimental surgeon.

After her three-month recovery, she was reunited with her fleet and returned to duty on the undermanned ship. She then spent five weeks in Bombay where her crewmates noticed that she did not shave her face and nicknamed her "Miss Molly Gray". This prompted her to "begin flirting with the local women" as a way to reduce suspicion about her sex. Shortly thereafter, Gray returned home to England after being discharged for complications with her wounds.

In 1750, her unit returned to Britain and travelled from Portsmouth to London, where she revealed her sex to her shipmates on 2 June. She petitioned Prince William, Duke of Cumberland, the head of the army, for her pension. She also sold her story to London publisher Robert Walker, who published her account, The Female Soldier, in two different editions. She also began to appear on stage in their uniform presenting military drills and singing songs. Three painters painted her portrait in her uniform and The Gentleman's Magazine reported her claims. She was honourably discharged and the Royal Hospital Chelsea officially recognized Snell's military service in November, and granted a pension in 1750 of 5d per day, £7/12/1 per year (increased in 1785), which was rare at the time.

== Later life ==
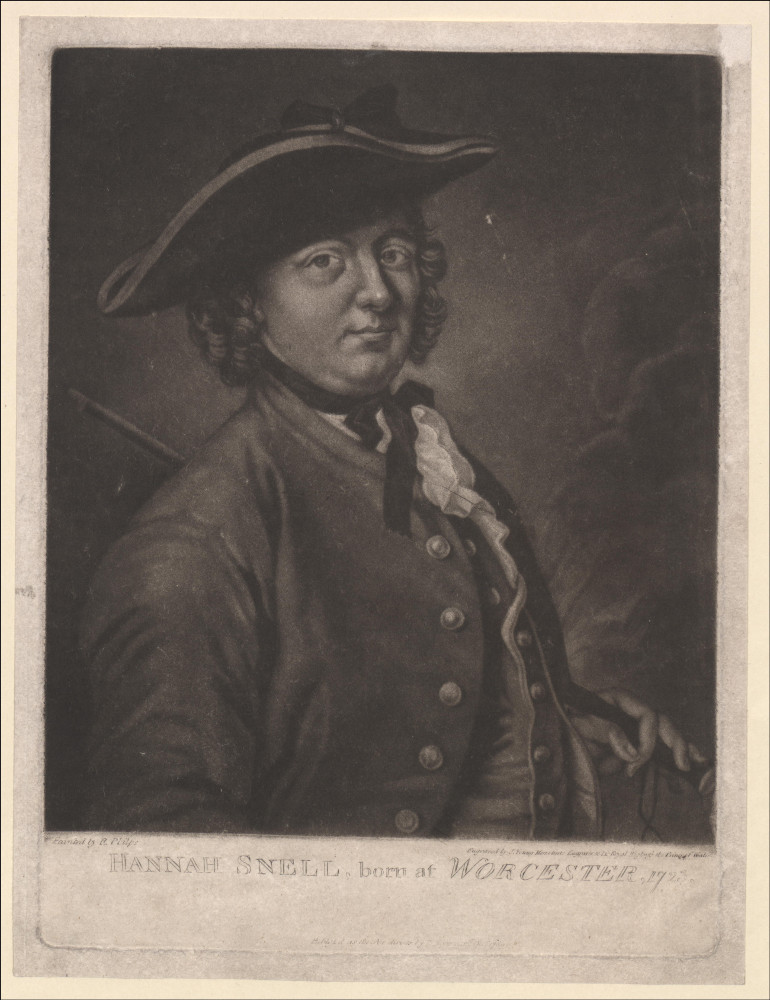
Hannah Snell, engraving, 1789

Sources claim that after receiving her pension, Snell retired to Wapping and kept a pub named either The Female Warrior or The Widow in Masquerade, but it did not last long. By the mid-1750s, Snell was living in Newbury in Berkshire. In 1759, she married Richard Eyles there, with whom she had two children. In 1772, she married Richard Habgood of Welford, also in Berkshire, and the two moved to the Midlands. In 1785, she was living with her child George Spence Eyles, a clerk, on Church Street, Stoke Newington.

In 1791, her mental condition suddenly worsened. She was admitted to Bethlem Hospital on 20 August and died on 8 February 1792. She was buried at Chelsea Hospital (now the Old Burial Ground, Royal Hospital Chelsea).

== Legacy ==
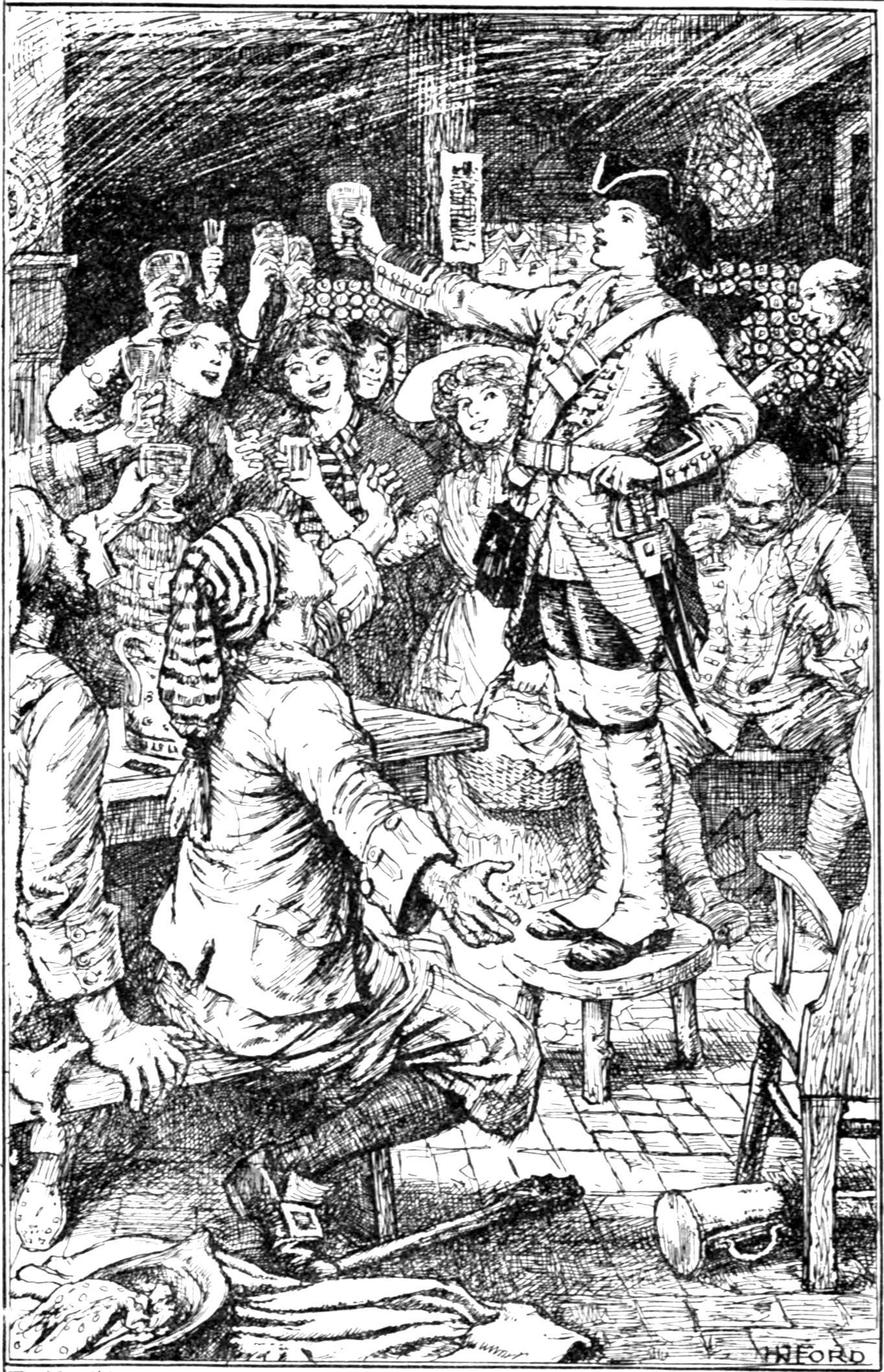
Snell portrayed by H. J. Ford, 1913

Playwright Shirley Gee has written two fictional dramatizations of Snell's life: a radio play, Against the Wind (1988) and a stage play, Warrior (1989).

Hannah Snell is mentioned in the 1969 film The Prime of Miss Jean Brodie as a woman who was prepared to "serve, suffer and sacrifice."

There are numerous accounts of Snell’s life. Snell’s memoir The Female Sailor was released in 1750 by London publisher Robert Walker. It has continued to be in circulation even to the present day, available in the following books: The Female Soldier; Or, The Surprising Life and Adventures of Hannah Snell (2011), The Lady Tars: The Autobiographies of Hanna Snell, Mary Lacy, Mary Talbot, and Mary Anne Talbot (2008), and The Female Soldier: Two Accounts of Women Who Served & Fought as Men (2011). Snell’s life is also the subject of further examination. For instance, Hannah Snell: The Secret Life of a Female Marine (2014) investigates the context in which her life took place, while Female Husbands (2020) discusses themes related to Snell’s and other figures’ "transing" of gender.

Abbreviated magazine and newspaper accounts of Snell’s life were also widespread both within and beyond England. One such early article was released in a 1750 issue of London’s The Gentleman’s Magazine. Records of later 1800s publications show the reach of Snell’s narrative; articles on Snell’s in US magazines and newspapers, for instance, are found in The New York Ledger (1865), Boston’s Ballou’s Dollar Monthly (1855–1865), Minnesota’s The St. Paul Globe (1890), and Utah’s The Salt Lake Herald (1893). Snell’s media presence decreased in the 1900s. Documented publications about her during this period, however, were still present in Utah’s The Salt Lake Tribune (1910) and Oregon's The Gazette-Times (1914).

The pronouns and gender identity assigned to Snell vary between publications. In Snell’s original 1746 memoir, she referred to herself as "Hannah Snell" and used female pronouns. However, the subsequent 1750 version identified the author as James Gray. Later editions and newspaper articles reverted back to using "Hannah Snell". Much of the academic work on Snell likewise uses her birth name and pronouns, although papers in transgender studies and related fields have diverged from this norm.
