= List of ship launches in 1746 =

The list of ship launches in 1746 includes a chronological list of some ships launched in 1746.

Date	Ship	Class	Builder	Location	Country	Notes
27 January	Surprize	Sixth rate	James Wyatt & John Major	Bucklers Hard	Great Britain	For Royal Navy.
29 January	Salisbury	Fourth rate	Philomon Ewer	East Cowes	Great Britain	For Royal Navy.
January	Britannia	East Indiaman	John Perry	Blackwall Yard	Great Britain	For British East India Company.
11 February	Rye	Sixth rate	Robert Carter	Southampton	Great Britain	For Royal Navy.
9 March	Conquérant	Citoyen-class ship of the line		Toulon	Kingdom of France	For French Navy.
9 March	Fatih-i-Bahri	Third rate		Constantinople	Ottoman Empire	For Ottoman Navy.
21 April	Christiansburg	Frigate		Copenhagen	Denmark-Norway	For Dano-Norwegian Navy.
26 April	Fox	Sixth rate	Philomon Ewer	Bursledon	Great Britain	For Royal Navy.
10 May	Kent	Third rate		Deptford Dockyard	Great Britain	For Royal Navy.
4 June	Sant Iseppo	Third rate	Piero Moro	Venice	Republic of Venice	For Venetian Navy.
11 June	Centaur	Sixth rate	Hugh Blaydes	Hull	Great Britain	For Royal Navy.
11 June	Viper	Sloop of war	Tito Durrell	Poole	Great Britain	For Royal Navy.
24 June	Panther	Fourth rate		Plymouth Dockyard	Great Britain	For Royal Navy.
26 June	Lichfield	Fourth rate	John Barnarcd	Harwich	Great Britain	For Royal Navy.
8 July	Scorpion	Merlin-class sloop	James Wyatt & John Major	Bucklers Hard	Great Britain	For Royal Navy.
2 August	Pie	Pie-class flûte	Pierre Chaillé Fils	Havre de Grâce	Kingdom of France	For French Navy.
17 August	Africa	Africa-class ship of the line		Havana	(Spain) Cuba	For Spanish Navy.
31 August	Carpe	Pie-class flûte	Pierre Chaillé Fils	Havre de Grâce	Kingdom of France	For French Navy.
5 September	Anson	East Indiaman	John Perry	Blackwall Yard	Great Britain	For British East India Company.
10 September	Lys	Lys-class ship of the line	Jacques-Luc Coulomb	Brest	Kingdom of France	For French Navy.
20 September	Colchester	Fourth rate	Carter	Southampton	Great Britain	For Royal Navy.
September	Porcupine	Sloop of war	James Taylor	Rotherhithe	Great Britain	For Royal Navy.
3 November	Grampus	Merlin-class sloop	John Reed	Hull	Great Britain	For Royal Navy.
23 November	Arundel	Sixth rate	Vernon Chitty	West Itchenor	Great Britain	For Royal Navy.
2 December	Deal Castle	Sixth rate	Richard Golightly	Liverpool	Great Britain	For Royal Navy.
3 December	Anglesea	Fifth rate	John Parke & John Gorril	Liverpool	Great Britain	For Royal Navy.
19 December	Saltash	Merlin-class sloop	John Quallett	Rotherhithe	Great Britain	For Royal Navy.
22 December	Vencador	Africa-class ship of the line		Havana	(Spain) Cuba	For Spanish Navy.
Unknown date	Bredenhof	East Indiaman			Dutch Republic	For Dutch East India Company.
Unknown date	Eastcourt	East Indiaman			Great Britain	For British East India Company.
Unknown date	Fyen	Fourth rate			Denmark-Norway	For Dano-Norwegian Navy.
Unknown date	Grantham	East Indiaman			Great Britain	For British East India Company.
Unknown date	Brave	Galley	Pierre Chabert	Marseille	Kingdom of France	For French Navy.
Unknown date	Nellebladet	Fourth rate			Denmark-Norway	For Dano-Norwegian Navy.
Unknown date	Oxford	East Indiaman			Great Britain	For British East India Company.
Unknown date	Prince Edward	East Indiaman			Great Britain	For private owner.
Unknown date	Prince Edward	East Indiaman			Great Britain	For British East India Company.
Unknown date	True Briton	East Indiaman			Great Britain	For British East India Company.
Unknown date	Veere	Fourth rate		Vlissingen	Dutch Republic	For Dutch Navy.
Unknown date	Waterland	Fourth rate	Charles Bentam	Amsterdam	Dutch Republic	For Dutch Navy.
