= Old Burial Ground =

Old Burial Ground may refer to:

- Old Burial Ground, Royal Hospital Chelsea
- Old Burying Ground (Cambridge, Massachusetts)
- Putney Old Burial Ground
- Sydney Town Hall, also known as the Old Burial Ground
