= HMS Panther =

Six ships of the Royal Navy have been named HMS Panther, after the panther, whilst another two were planned:

- HMS Panther (1703) was a 54-gun fourth-rate ship of the line launched in 1703. She was rebuilt in 1716, hulked in 1743 and sold in 1768.
- HMS Panther (1746) was 50-gun fourth rate launched in 1746 and broken up in 1756.
- HMS Panther (1758) was a 60-gun fourth rate launched in 1758. She was used as a prison hulk from 1807, and was broken up in 1813.
- HMS Panther (1778) was a 14-gun sloop built in 1778, and was being used as a survey vessel in 1802.
- HMS Panther (1897) was a B-class torpedo boat destroyer launched in 1897 and sold in 1920.
- HMS Panther (G41) was a P-class destroyer launched in 1941 and sunk in 1943.
- HMS Panther was a planned Leopard-class frigate, but she was launched instead for the Indian Navy as Brahmaputra in 1957. She was deleted from the Indian Navy Lists in 1985.
- HMS Panther was a planned Salisbury-class frigate, ordered in 1956 but her name was changed to HMS Gloucester, before being eventually cancelled. Gloucester was subsequently reordered as a Leander-class frigate. Note, however, that no Leander-class frigate named Gloucester ever served in the Royal Navy. The name Gloucester was re-used in 1982 for a Type 42 destroyer.
