= The Pageants =

London shipyard

The Pageants was a shipyard in Rotherhithe on the River Thames, London. It was established in the early 18th century and one of its first occupants was John Buxton of Deptford. After being used by Buxton for construction of Navy ships between 1741 and 1744 the yard fell into decline, possibly being used to store timber and later as a ship-breakers.

== Ships ==
Buxton constructed six warships for the Royal Navy during his time at the Pageants:

- 44-gun fifth-rate HMS Launceston – 1741
- 24-gun sixth-rate HMS Lowestoffe – 1741
- 14-gun sloop HMS Otter – 1742
- 24-gun sixth-rate HMS Sheerness – 1743
- 14-gun sloop HMS Drake – 1743
- 10-gun sloop HMS Swallow – 1743
