= HDMS Fyen =

HDMS Fyen is the name of the following ships of the Royal Danish Navy:

- HDMS Fyen (1705), designed by Ole Judichær
- HDMS Fyen (1736), a 50-gun ship of the line
- HDMS Fyen (1746), a 50-gun ship of the line designed by Andreas Gerner launched in 1746
- HDMS Fyen (1787), a 74-gun ship of the line designed by Henrik Gerner launched in 1787
- HDMS Fyen (1880), a cruiser
- HDMS Fyen (N36), a Falster-class minelayer launched in 1962, decommissioned in 2003
