= Old Burial Ground, Royal Hospital Chelsea =

British cemetery

Coordinates: 51°29′19″N 0°09′24″W

The Old Burial Ground is a cemetery for people associated with the Royal Hospital Chelsea. It is located at the north east corner of the Royal Hospital grounds, alongside the London Road.

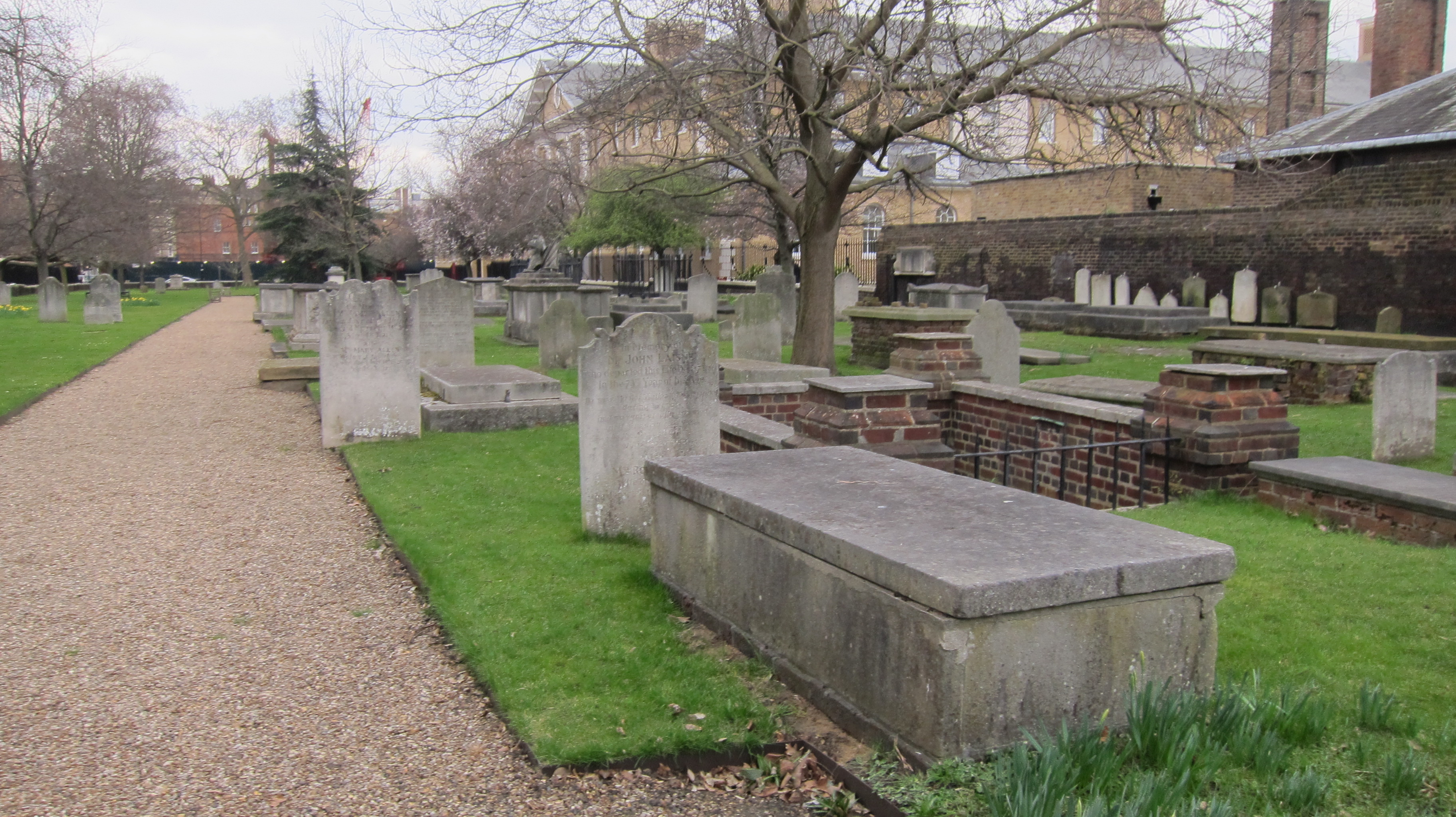
the Old Burial Ground in March 2015

The Old Burial Ground is Grade II listed on the Register of Historic Parks and Gardens as part of the larger Royal Hospital site.

The ground was consecrated for burials in August 1691. 10,000 interments were made at the Old Burial Ground until 1854. The last burial was made in 1854. The ground re-opened for the burials of cremated remains in 2004. Following the closure of the Old Burial Ground pensioners were buried at Brompton Cemetery between 1855 and 1893 and have since been buried at the New Plot at Brookwood Cemetery in Surrey since 1962; the Old Plot at Brookwood having closed that year.

A variety of funerary monuments are present at the Old Burial Ground including headstones, table tombs and slabs.

== Notable burials ==
- William Cheselden (died 1752), innovative surgeon and anatomist
- Charles Burney (died 1814), who was organist at the Royal Hospital from 1783 to 1814 and author of General History of Music
- Christiana Davis (died 1739), female soldier
- David Dundas (died 1820), Scottish army officer who retired as Commander-in-Chief of the British Army
- William Hiseland (died 1720), supercentenarian and soldier
- Thomas Ogle, (died 1702) first Governor of the Royal Hospital
- Hannah Snell (died 1792), female soldier
