= HMS Hazard (1744) =

Sloop of the Royal Navy

History

Great Britain
- Name: HMS Hazard
- Ordered: 4 April 1744
- Builder: John Buxton, Snr, Rotherhithe
- Laid down: 26 April 1744
- Launched: 11 December 1744
- Completed: 2 March 1745 at Deptford Dockyard
- Commissioned: November 1744
- Fate: Sold in 1749

General characteristics
- Class & type: Merlin-class sloop
- Tons burthen: 272 83/94 bm
- Length: 92 ft 3.75 in (28.1 m) (gundeck); 74 ft 11.125 in (22.8 m) (keel)
- Beam: 26 ft 2 in (8.0 m)
- Depth of hold: 12 ft 0 in (3.66 m)
- Sail plan: Snow brig
- Complement: 110
- Armament: 10 × 6-pounder guns

HMS Hazard was a 14-gun Merlin-class sloop launched in 1744. She was captured in November 1745 by Jacobite forces in Montrose harbour and was sailed to Dunkirk and was renamed Le Prince Charles.

In March 1746, the ship was carrying £13,000 in gold, arms and other supplies to Inverness, when she was intercepted and was chased by HMS Sheerness, which recaptured Le Prince Charles in the Kyle of Tongue on 26 March.

Reverting to her previous name Hazard, she was sold in 1749.
