= HMS Raven (1829) =

Cutter of the Royal Navy

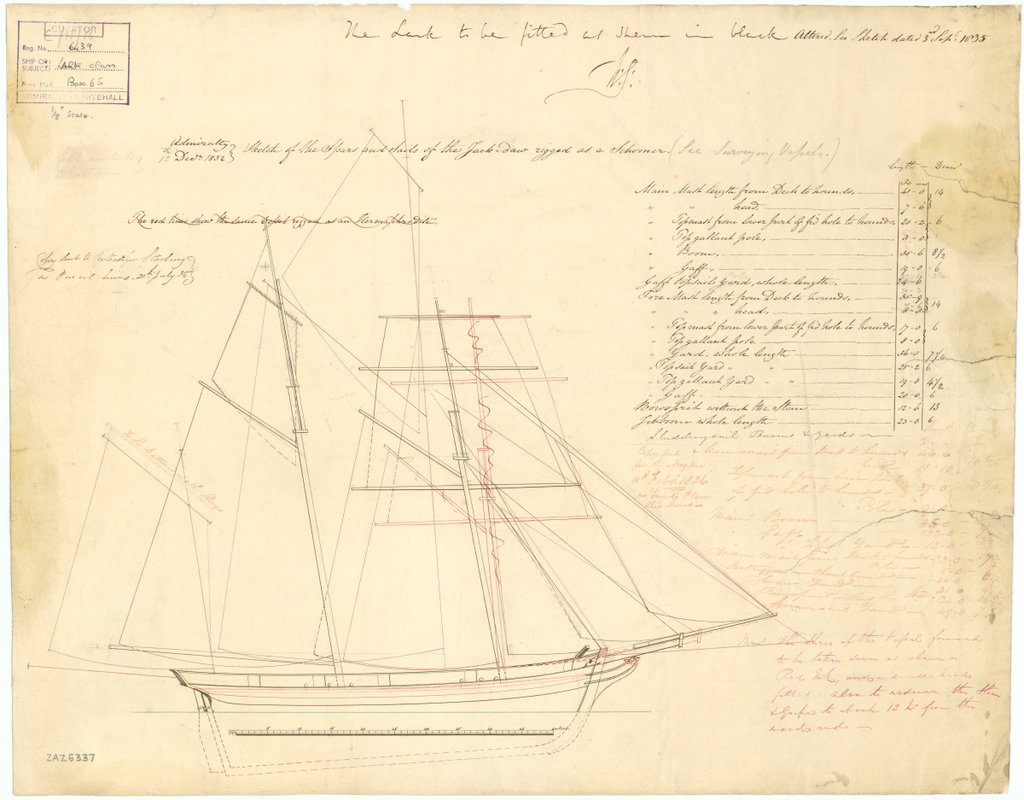
- Sail plan for Raven.

History

United Kingdom
- Name: Raven
- Namesake: Raven
- Ordered: 8 November 1828
- Builder: Pembroke Dockyard
- Laid down: June 1829
- Launched: 21 October 1829
- Completed: 29 December 1829
- Fate: Sold for scrap, 28 October 1859

General characteristics
- Class & type: Lark-class cutter
- Tons burthen: 108 63/94 bm
- Length: 60 ft 9 in (18.5 m) (gundeck); 49 ft 5 in (15.1 m) (keel)
- Beam: 22 ft 2 in (6.8 m)
- Draught: 9 ft 5 in (2.9 m)
- Depth: 9 ft (2.7 m)
- Sail plan: Schooner rig
- Complement: 34
- Armament: 2 × 6-pdr cannon; 2 × 6-pdr carronades

HMS Raven was a four-gun Lark-class cutter built for the Royal Navy during the 1820s. She was sold for scrap in 1859.

== Description ==
Raven had a length at the gundeck of 60 feet 9 inches (18.5 m) and 49 feet 5 inches (15.1 m) at the keel. She had a beam of 20 feet 5 inches (6.2 m), a draught of about 9 feet 5 inches (2.9 m) and a depth of hold of 9 feet (2.7 m). The ship's tonnage was 108 63/94 tons burthen. The Lark class was armed with two 6-pounder cannon and a pair of 6-pounder carronades. The ships had a crew of 35 officers and ratings.

== Construction and career ==
Raven, the eighth ship of her name to serve in the Royal Navy, was ordered on 8 November 1828, laid down in June 1829 at Pembroke Dockyard, Wales, and launched on 21 October 1829. She was completed on 29 December 1829 at Plymouth Dockyard. On 7 November 1844, Raven ran aground in the English Channel off Dungeness, Kent and was damaged. She was taken in to Sheerness, Kent for repairs.

On the 19 November 1832 when trying to enter the Douro the Raven was fired on by the Cabedelo batteries which had been erected by Dom Miguel's forces on the sandspit that ran out from the south bank of the Douro London Courier and Evening Gazette, Monday 3 December 1832, p. 2, Col-B: “Lisbon Papers". The batteries which had been finished on 7 November made it much more difficult for ships to enter the Douro to supply Dom Pedro's forces during the Siege of Oporto. The previous day (18 November) the batteries had fired on the Osprey cutter which was loaded with shot, shell, and ammunition, and the yacht Swallow which had eighty volunteers for Dom Pedro's army on board (Morning Chronicle, Monday 3 December 1832, p. 3, Col-D: Unheaded news item; Plymouth and Devonport Weekly Journal and General Advertiser for Devon, Cornwall, Somerset and Dorset, Thursday 6 December 1832, p. 2, Col-A: “Portugal”; Leeds Patriot and Yorkshire Advertiser, Saturday 8 December 1832, p. 4, Col-C: “Portugal: Portsmouth, Wednesday Evening, Nov. 21”). Neither of these two ships got into Oporto, and both returned to England.
