= HMS Sheerness (1743) =

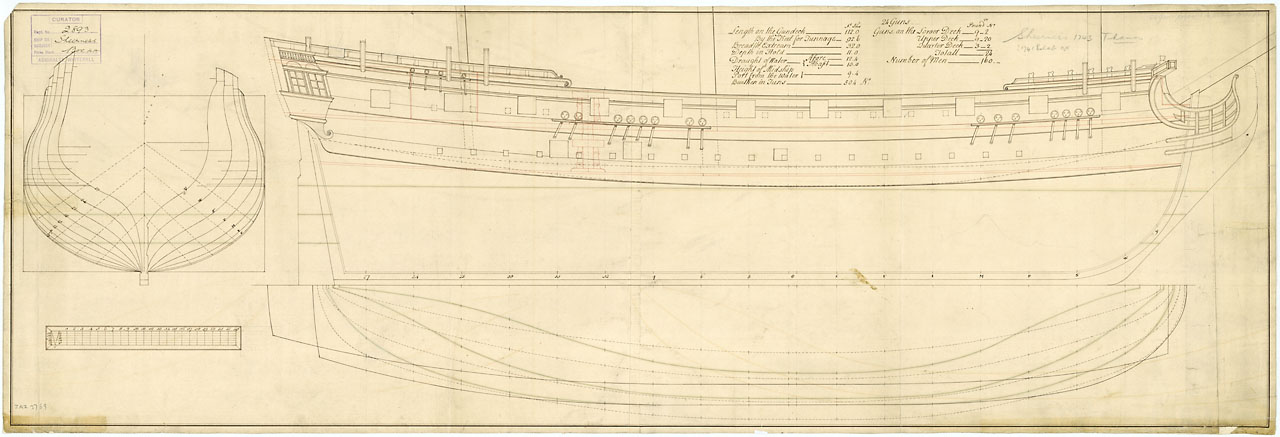
- Sheerness

History

Great Britain
- Name: HMS Sheerness
- Ordered: 7 January 1743
- Builder: John Buxton, Snr, Rotherhithe
- Laid down: 24 January 1743
- Launched: 8 October 1743
- Completed: By 19 November 1743
- Fate: Sold on 26 July 1768

General characteristics
- Class & type: 24-gun sixth rate frigate
- Tons burthen: 508 69/94 bm
- Length: 112 ft (34 m) (gundeck); 92 ft 11 in (28.32 m) (keel)
- Beam: 32 ft 1 in (9.78 m)
- Depth of hold: 11 ft (3.4 m)
- Sail plan: Full-rigged ship
- Complement: 140 (160 from 1745)
- Armament: 24 guns; Upper deck: 20 × 9-pounder guns; c. 1745 added: Lower deck: 2 × 9-pounder guns; Quarterdeck: 2 × 3-pounder guns

HMS Sheerness was a 24-gun sixth rate frigate of the Royal Navy launched in 1743. Commanded by Captain O'Brian, she served on patrol duties in the North Sea during the 1745 Jacobite Rising.

In November 1745, she captured a French ship carrying supplies to Montrose, along with a number of Jacobite officers. They included Charles Radclyffe, de jure Earl of Derwentwater, who was executed at Tower Hill on 8 December 1746.

In the Skirmish of Tongue on 26 March 1746, Sheerness chased the Jacobite Le Prince Charles, formerly HMS Hazard, into the Kyle of Tongue. Its crew disembarked, taking with them £13,000 in gold intended to help finance the Rising, but were intercepted and forced to surrender by government militia.

In 1752, she was equipped with Hales ventilators, worked by a windmill. During the Seven Years' War, she captured the French merchant-ship Auguste off Spain on 18 August 1756; sold to British merchants and renamed 'Augusta', it was wrecked carrying French passengers returning from Quebec to France in 1761.

She was sold in 1768.

== Sources ==
- Mackay, Angus (1906). The Book of Mackay. Norman MacLeod.
- Secombe, Thomas (1896). Dictionary of National Biography, 1885-1900, Volume 47. Radcliffe, James (Charles sub-section): Smith, Elder & Co.
