= HMS Vulture (1744) =

Sloop of the Royal Navy

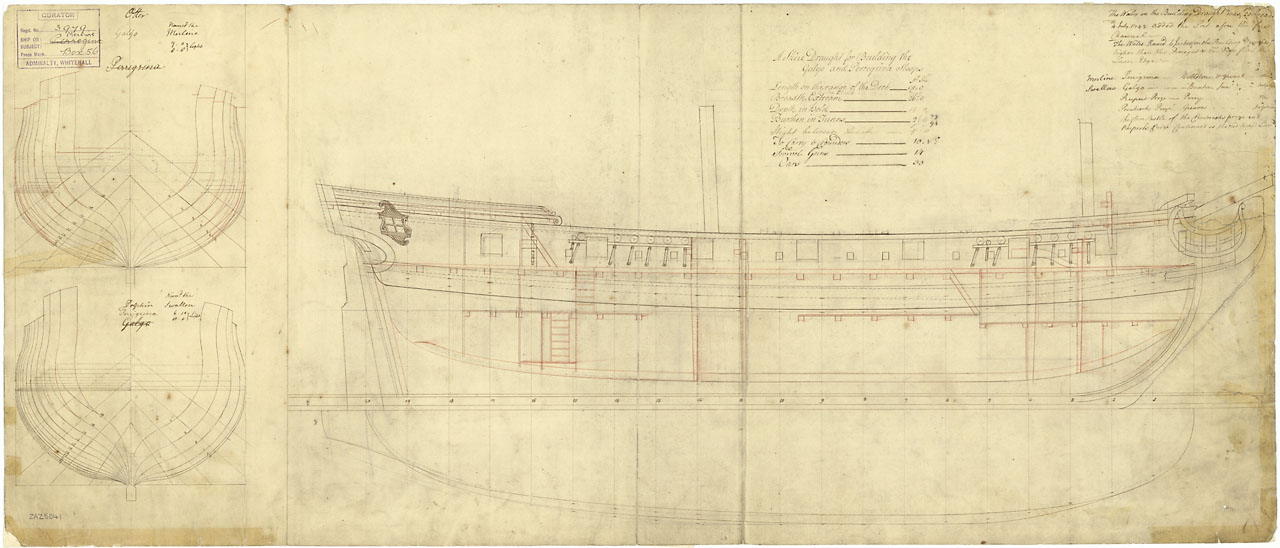
- Plans of the Vulture

History

Great Britain
- Name: HMS Vulture
- Ordered: 6 August 1743
- Builder: John Greaves, Limehouse
- Laid down: 16 September 1743
- Launched: 4 May 1744
- Completed: 24 May 1744 at Deptford Dockyard
- Commissioned: April 1744
- Fate: Sold to break up at Portsmouth on 30 January 1761

General characteristics
- Class & type: Hind-class sloop
- Tons burthen: 267 3/94 (bm)
- Length: 91 ft 4 in (27.8 m) (gundeck); 73 ft 10.875 in (22.5 m) (keel)
- Beam: 26 ft 0.75 in (7.9 m)
- Depth of hold: 12 ft 1.75 in (3.7 m)
- Sail plan: Snow brig
- Armament: 10 × 6-pounder guns (14 guns from 1748)

HMS Vulture was a 10-gun two-masted Hind-class sloop of the Royal Navy, designed by Joseph Allin and built by John Greaves at Limehouse on the Thames River, England and launched on 4 May 1744, during the War of the Austrian Succession. Her name was often written as Vulter.

The Vulture set sail from Portsmouth as part of a joint Anglo-Dutch fleet under Vice Admiral Thomas Davers in September 1744. In the spring of 1746, the Vulture and the 14-gun sloop HMS Shark engaged two superior French men of war. The Vulture broke off from the action to alert two nearby British cruisers. The arrival of these reinforcements caused the French ships to surrender. The sloop was part of a squadron that sailed from Britain in 1747 under Admirals Anson and Warren. On 3 June, the Vulture intercepted the lightly armed Cherbourg dogger privateer L'Huitre in the English Channel between the British coast and the Isle of Wight. The sloop captured the privateer intact after a three-hour chase.

After service from 1744 to 1749 (when her armament was increased to 14 × 6-pounder guns), and then from 1751 to 1758, she was sold to be taken to pieces at Portsmouth on 30 January 1761.
