= HMS Swallow (1744) =

Royal Navy sloop

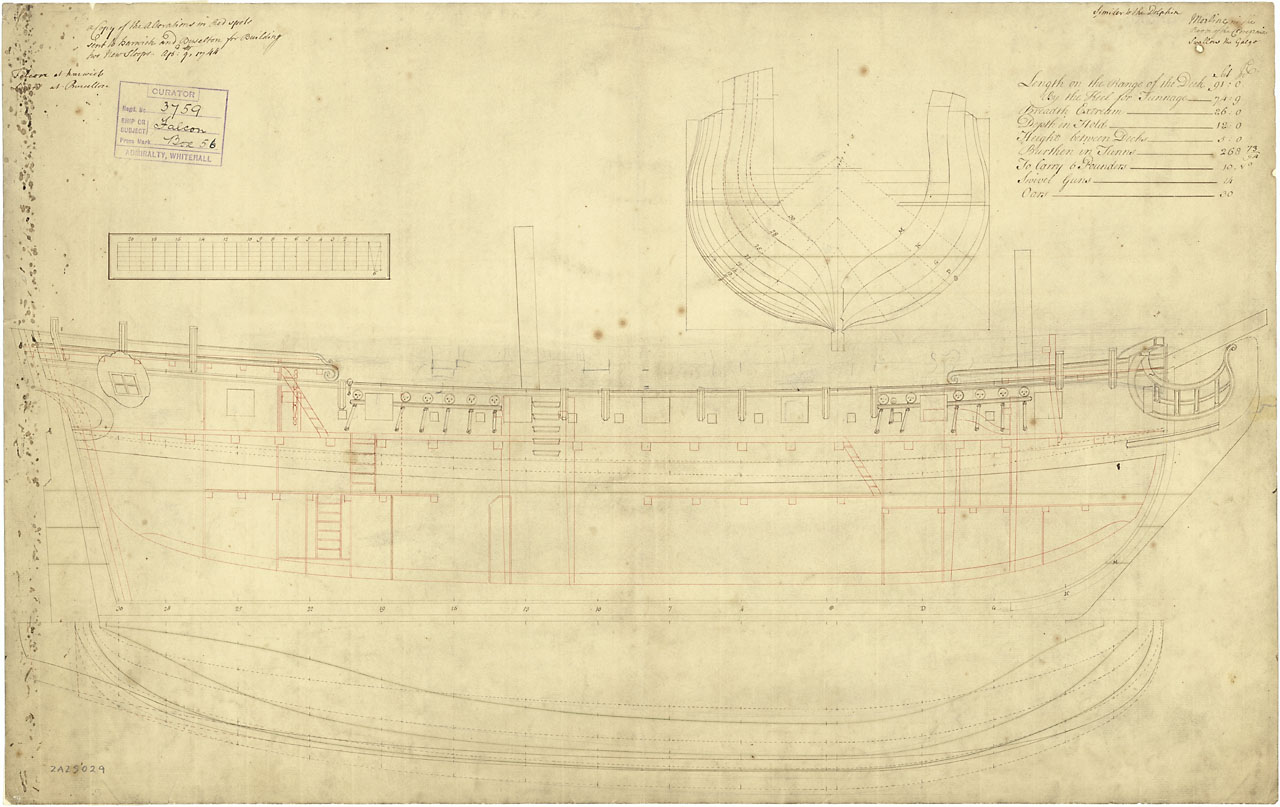
- Design of Swallow

History

Great Britain
- Name: HMS Swallow
- Namesake: Swallow
- Ordered: 7 July 1743
- Builder: John Buxton, The Pageants
- Cost: £3,752
- Laid down: 30 July 1743
- Launched: 17 February 1744
- Completed: 25 March 1744
- Commissioned: 3 February 1744
- Fate: Wrecked 24 December 1744

General characteristics
- Class & type: Merlin-class sloop
- Tons burthen: 27155/94 (bm)
- Length: Gundeck: 91 ft 4 in (27.8 m); Keel: 73 ft 11 3/4 in (22.5 m)
- Beam: 26 ft 3 1/4 in (8 m)
- Depth of hold: 6 ft 11 in (2.1 m)
- Propulsion: Sails
- Complement: 110
- Armament: 10 × 6-pounder guns + 14 × ½-pounder swivels

HMS Swallow was a 10-gun Merlin-class sloop of the Royal Navy that prior to her commissioning was briefly known as HMS Galgo. Launched in 1744, the ship sailed to North America in June, bringing news of the start of King George's War and capturing two merchant vessels. Serving off South Carolina, on 24 December Swallow was sailing from Charleston to New Providence when she was wrecked on the Bahama Banks. Returning to Charleston in the sloop Pelham, the Irish members of Swallow's crew planned a mutiny on 21 January 1745 to take the ship to St. Augustine, Florida, but were arrested before they could do so.

== Design ==
Swallow was a 6-pounder Merlin-class sloop. The class was designed by the shipwright Jacob Acworth in 1743 as a more heavily gunned variant of sloop to replace classes such as the Baltimore-class sloop, that were armed with 4-pounders. The Merlin class was the first class of sloop to be armed with 6-pounders. The first order of ships for the class saw two sloops constructed, intended to replace two ex-Spanish sloops that the Royal Navy had captured and put to use. Swallow was built in the place of the 12-gun sloop HMS Galgo. While they were established as 10-gun vessels, the sloops were built with 7 gun ports on each side, providing them with the capability to hold a larger armament.

The vessels were rigged as snows. The design became the standard for the Admiralty, and between 1744 and 1746 a further nineteen sloops were ordered to the Merlin class. The sloops were the largest single-design class of ship in the Royal Navy when they were procured, and continued to be so until the advent of the Swan-class ship-sloop in the 1770s.

== Construction ==
With the construction of all ships of the class contracted out to civilian shipyards, Swallow was ordered to John Buxton of The Pageants on 7 July 1743. She was laid down on 30 July and launched on 17 February 1744 with the following dimensions: 91 feet 4 inches (27.8 m) along the upper deck, 73 feet 11 3/4 inches (22.5 m) at the keel, with a beam of 26 feet 3 1/4 inches (8 m) and a depth in the hold of 6 feet 11 inches (2.1 m). Swallow and her sister HMS Merlin were fitted with a platform in their hold which severely decreased the depth of it; this feature was discontinued in most of their successors. Swallow measured 27155/94 tons burthen. (Note: The class was nominally ordered at 268 tons burthen.)

Swallow was fitted out at Deptford, being completed on 25 March. She carried ten 6-pounder guns and fourteen half-pounder swivel guns, with a crew of 110. In total she cost £3,752 to construct. The ship was originally named Galgo in reference to the ship she was replacing but on 31 January, while still under construction, she was instead named after the swallow. The name was well-used in English service, dating back to 1345.

== Service and wreck ==
Swallow was commissioned under Commander Andrews Jelfe on 3 February 1744. By 10 April she was at Deal, Kent. Swallow was then sent to North America, carrying a letter from Thomas Pelham-Holles, 1st Duke of Newcastle to William Shirley, the governor of the Province of Massachusetts Bay, announcing the start of King George's War. Swallow arrived in Boston on 2 June; her news placed the colony on a war footing, with Shirley forwarding the message to his fellow governors. The London newspaper the Evening Post reported that by 12 July Swallow was still serving off New England, having captured a French merchant ship from Martinique and recaptured the British ship Beckford, from Jamaica.

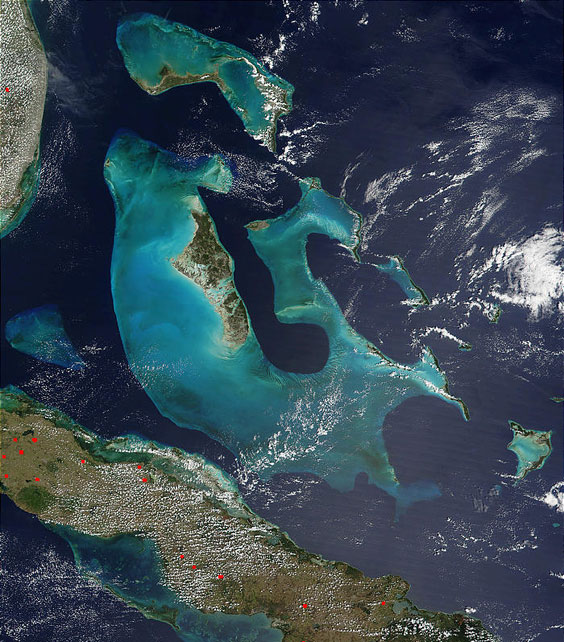
The Bahamas, showing the Bahama Banks in light blue which Swallow was wrecked on

Swallow continued in North America, ordered to serve off South Carolina. In late December the ship was tasked with sailing from Charleston to New Providence, returning two brass mortars and their ammunition which had been lent to Major-General James Oglethorpe for the Siege of St. Augustine. On 24 December Swallow was nearing the Bahamas. Making her way between Great Sale Key and the Abaco Islands, the ocean current moved Swallow further to the east than her crew had calculated. Believing they were in deep water, the ship sailed on until 9:30pm when breaking waves were spotted ahead. The crew attempted to turn Swallow away from the danger but were unable to do so before she grounded on the Bahama Banks.

The waves began to beat Swallow against the rocks of the reef. Attempts were immediately made to free the ship. The crew cut away her foremast, main topmast, and anchors, but this had little impact and Swallow began to fill with water. The ship's boats were taken out and rafts were constructed from her yards and rigging. They abandoned Swallow in the morning of 25 December and the crew used their craft to shelter on Abaco. Jelfe used one of the boats to sail to Nassau where he met Peter Henry Bruce, a military engineer who had been to sail in Swallow on her return to Charleston. On 5 January 1745 Bruce and Jelfe returned to the wreck of Swallow in the sloop Pelham. Over several days they collected Swallow's crew from around Abaco and then sailed on to Charleston.

Pelham arrived off Charleston in the evening of 21 January. Planning to wait until the following day to cross the sand bar outside the harbour, Jelfe was informed by members of his crew that the Irish among them were planning to mutiny, take control of Pelham and sail her to St. Augustine, Florida. To forestall this Pelham attempted to reach Charleston as soon as possible, but struck the sand bar and had to sail back out to sea. To stop the mutineers from beginning their attack Pelham began firing its guns in distress. Jelfe sent his officers in to Charleston in a boat, warning the authorities of the planned mutiny. In the early morning of 22 January two long boats conveyed a group of armed men out to Pelham, escorted by a 20-gun warship. Pelham rounded the sand bar and the mutineers were arrested and taken on board the other ship. Swallow's crew then returned to Charleston.

Jelfe afterwards sent his lieutenant back to England to report to the Admiralty on the loss of the ship. Jelfe's career was not negatively affected by the wreck; he was promoted to captain on 14 April 1746 and served in command of four other warships before his death in 1765. Parts of Swallow, including the mortars, her guns, anchors, sails, and rigging, were salvaged and taken to New Providence. Much of this was subsequently sold to the Spanish. A later ship of the Merlin class, HMS Swallow, was named in replacement to Swallow.
