= Devicottah =

Island of India

Theevukottai (Tamil: தீவுக்கோட்டை, island-fort), more popularly known by its Anglicized name Devicottah, is an island at the mouth of the Kollidam River where it joins the Bay of Bengal. Obtained by the East India Company from the Thanjavur Maratha king Shahuji in 1749 in return for his reinstatement, the English thought that Devicottah would make an excellent, defensible harbour and built a fort at the place. Shortly afterwards, the fort was captured by the French and recaptured by the British during the Seven Years' War. The place fell to the British once and for all in early 1760. The fort was deemed unfit for siege and was subsequently demolished and the settlement abandoned.
