= HMS Jamaica (1744) =

Sloop of the Royal Navy

History

Great Britain
- Name: HMS Jamaica
- Ordered: 18 August 1743
- Builder: Deptford Dockyard
- Laid down: 15 September 1743
- Launched: 17 July 1744
- Completed: 28 August 1744 at Deptford Dockyard
- Commissioned: July 1744
- Fate: Wrecked off Cuba on 27 January 1770

General characteristics
- Class & type: Hind-class sloop
- Tons burthen: 272 89/94 (bm)
- Length: 91 ft 5 in (27.9 m) (gundeck); 75 ft 0.75 in (22.9 m) (keel)
- Beam: 26 ft 1.75 in (8.0 m)
- Depth of hold: 12 ft 0 in (3.7 m)
- Sail plan: Snow brig
- Armament: 10 × 6-pounder guns, later increased in 1749 to 14 × 6-pounder guns

HMS Jamaica was a 10-gun (14-gun from 1749) two-masted Hind-class sloop of the Royal Navy, designed by Joseph Allin and built by him at Deptford Dockyard on the Thames River, England, and launched on 17 July 1744. She and her sister Trial were the only sloops to be built in the Royal Dockyards between 1733 and 1748.

On 28 October 1757 captured St. Estienne in company with the frigate Garland.

== Fate ==
Commander George Talbot and Jamaica were sailing from Jamaica to Pensacola when she was wrecked off Cuba on 27 January 1770. Towards evening she ran onto a reef. Efforts to lighten her and get her off failed and she started to fill with water. The crew improvised rafts and with her boats were able over the next three days to transfer all her stores and provisions to a small cay three miles away. At the same time a small boat was sent to get help. A schooner eventually rescued the survivors. The subsequent court martial of Talbot his officers, and crew found that a strong current had taken her further inshore than expected, resulting in her encountering the Coleradoes Reef.
