= HMS Hind (1744) =

Two-masted sloop of the Royal Navy from 1744

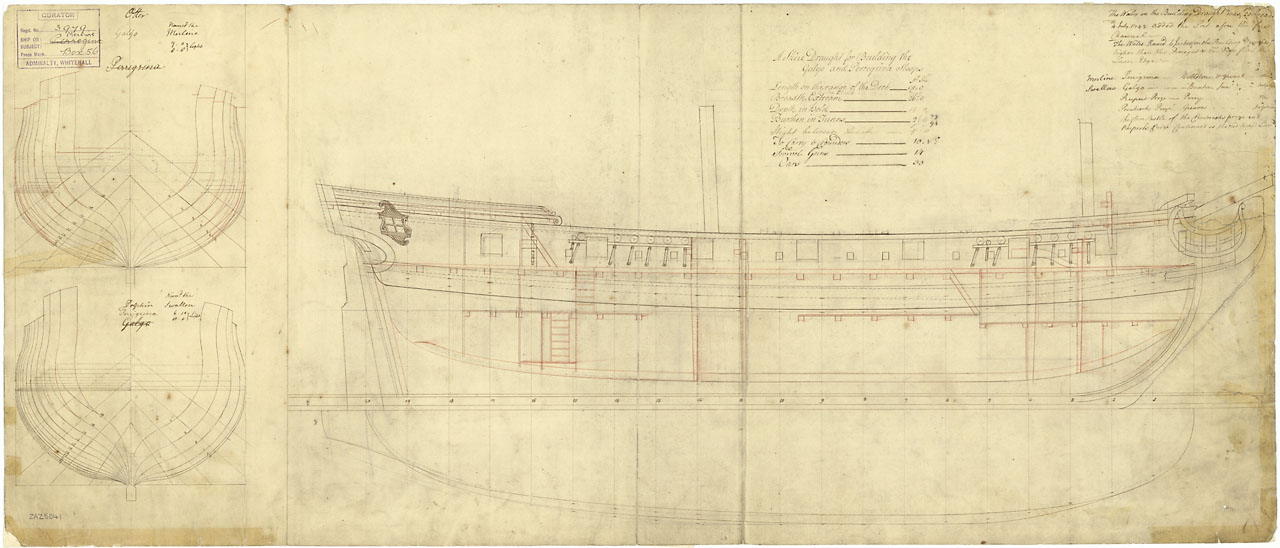
- Hind 1744

History

Great Britain
- Name: HMS Hind
- Ordered: 6 August 1743
- Builder: Philemon Perry, Blackwall, London
- Laid down: 11 September 1743
- Launched: 19 April 1744
- Completed: 12 May 1744 at Woolwich Dockyard
- Commissioned: April 1744
- Fate: Foundered off Louisbourg on 1 November 1747

General characteristics
- Class & type: Hind-class sloop
- Tons burthen: 272 57/94 (bm)
- Length: 91 ft 6 in (27.9 m) (gundeck); 75 ft 2.5 in (22.9 m) (keel)
- Beam: 26 ft 1.25 in (8.0 m)
- Depth of hold: 12 ft 2 in (3.7 m)
- Sail plan: Snow
- Armament: 10 × 6-pounder guns

HMS Hind was a 10-gun two-masted Hind-class sloop of the Royal Navy, designed by Joseph Allin and built by Philemon Perry at Blackwall on the Thames River, England and launched on 19 April 1744.

She was lost, presumed to have foundered, off Louisbourg, Nova Scotia in September 1747.
