= French ship Caribou (1744) =

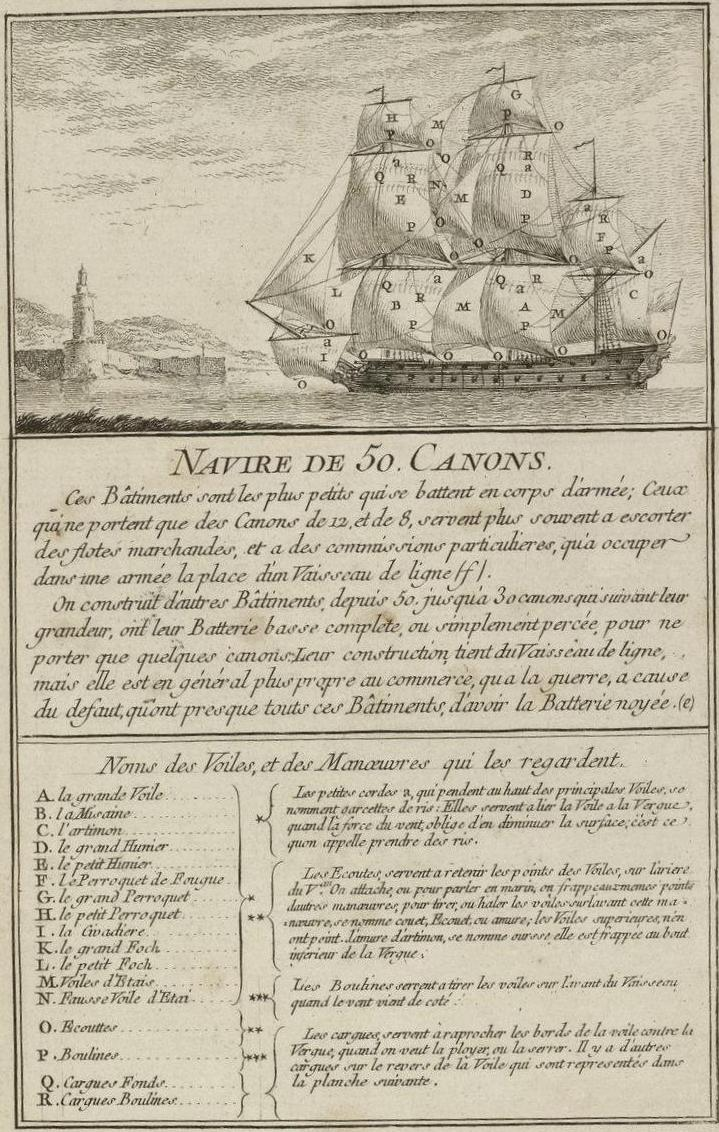
- French ship Caribou

History

France
- Name: Caribou
- Builder: René-Nicolas Levasseur
- Laid down: June 1742
- Launched: 13 May 1744
- Commissioned: July 1744

General characteristics
- Type: Fourth-rate ship of the line
- Complement: 5 officers, 300 men
- Armament: Lower gun deck: 22 × French 18-pounder guns; Upper gun deck: 24 × French 8-pounder guns; Quarterdeck: 4 × French 4-pounder guns

Caribou was a French fourth-rate ship of the line, launched in 1744. She had a broadside weight of 302 French livres. Her lower gun deck was equipped with 22 French 18-pounder guns, her upper deck with 24 French 8-pounder guns, and her quarterdeck had 4 French 4-pounder guns.

She took part in the campaign to Saint-Domingue, and was later refitted as a powder hulk.
