= HMS Raven =

Fourteen ships and a shore establishment of the Royal Navy have borne the name Raven, after birds of the genus Corvus, particularly the common raven:

Ships

- English ship Raven (1652) was a 36-gun ship captured in 1652, and captured by the Dutch in 1654.
- English ship Raven (1656) was a 6-gun vessel, possibly a French ship, previously named St Cornelius. She was captured in 1656 and listed until 1659.
- HMS Raven (1745) was a 14-gun sloop launched in 1745 and sold in 1763.
- HMS Raven was a sloop, previously the 8-gun fireship HMS Vesuvius launched in 1771. She was renamed Raven later that year and was sold in 1780.
- HMS Raven was an 18-gun sloop, launched in 1777 as Ceres that the French captured in 1778. The British recaptured her in 1782 and renamed her Raven, only to have the French recapture her again early in 1783. She served in the French Navy until sold at Brest in 1791.
- HMS Raven (1796) was a 14-gun sloop launched in 1796 and wrecked in 1798.
- HMS Raven was an 18-gun brig-sloop, previously the French Aréthuse. She was captured in 1799 and wrecked in 1804.
- HMS Raven (1804) was an 18-gun Cruizer-class brig-sloop launched in 1804 and wrecked in 1805.
- HMS Raven (1805) was a 16-gun brig-sloop launched in 1805 and sold in 1816.
- HMS Raven (1829) was a 4-gun survey cutter launched in 1829. She became a quarantine ship in 1848, was transferred to the coastguard in 1850 and was sold in 1859.
- HMS Raven (1855) was a mortar vessel launched in 1855 and renamed MV 13 later that year; she was ordered to be sold in 1856.
- HMS Raven (1856) was an Albacore-class wooden screw gunboat launched in 1856 and sold in 1875.
- HMS Raven (1882) was a composite screw gunboat launched in 1882. She became a diving tender in 1904 and was sold in 1925.
- HMS Raven II was a seaplane carrier, previously a seized German merchant ship, in service between 1915 and 1917.

Shore establishment

- HMS Raven (shore establishment) was the Royal Naval Air Station at Eastleigh, Southampton in commission between 1939 and 1947.
