= HMS Panther (1746) =

Ship of the line of the Royal Navy

History

Great Britain
- Name: HMS Panther
- Ordered: 16 May 1743
- Builder: Plymouth Dockyard
- Laid down: 27 June 1743
- Launched: 24 June 1746
- Commissioned: May 1746
- Decommissioned: February 1748
- Fate: Broken up, July 1756

General characteristics
- Class & type: 50-gun fourth rate ship of the line
- Tons burthen: 968 ^{8}/94 bm
- Length: 140 ft (42.7 m) (gundeck); 113 ft 9 in (34.7 m) (keel)
- Beam: 40 ft (12.2 m)
- Depth of hold: 17 ft 2 1/2 in (5.2 m)
- Propulsion: Sails
- Sail plan: Full-rigged ship
- Armament: 50 guns: Gundeck: 22 × 24 pdrs; Upper gundeck: 22 × 12 pdrs; Quarterdeck: 4 × 6 pdrs; Forecastle: 2 × 6 pdrs

The Panther was a 50-gun fourth rate ship of the line of the Royal Navy, built at Plymouth Dockyard to the dimensions specified in the 1741 amendments to the 1719 Establishment; she was ordered on 16 May 1743 to be newbuilt "in the room of the old Panther'', which elderly ship was on 9 January 1744 instructed to be converted to a hulk.

Whereas all the other 50-gun ships to the 1741 specifications were built under commercial contracts to a design produced and circulated to the contractors by the Surveyor of the Navy, the Panther uniquely was built in a Royal Dockyard, and was to a design drawn by Thomas Fellowes, the Master Shipwright in charge at Plymouth, who supervised her construction. She thus differed noticeably from her nominal sisterships in lines and appearance, her midship section displaying a sharp turn of bilge, unlike the continuous sweep of the fourteen merchant-built vessels. The quarterdeck gunports and roundhouse (with its quarter lights) retained the layout of the 1733 specifications. The bow was much altered, with a raked stempost and a curved cutwater compared with the straight edge of the contract-built vessels. She was built and fitted out for a total cost of £20,695-18-5d. Sadly she decayed rapidly and saw less than two years' service.

== Guns ==
It was first intended that the 50-gun ships built to 1741 Establishment would carry the same ordnance as their predecessors, i.e. 18-pounder guns on the lower deck and 9-pounder guns on the upper deck. However, while they were under construction the 1743 Establishment of Guns was introduced, and in accordance with this, the group all carried 24-pounders on the lower deck and 12-pounders on the upper deck, with 6-pounders on the quarterdeck and forecastle.

== Career ==
The Panther was first commissioned in May 1746 under the command of Captain John Wickham, serving with Boscawen's squadron in the Bay of Biscay from September 1746. In August 1747 she was deployed to Newfoundland, returning to England to be paid off in February 1748.

On 12 May 1749 she was surveyed, and found to need a "Small Repair", estimated to require £1,200 and 13 weeks of work. On 29 July 1755, with the likelihood of war restarting, the Admiralty instructed that the Panther be put in condition for service, but in June 1756 she was surveyed again and found to be so defective that she would need an estimated £12,100 for repairs, so it was suggested that she should instead be broken up. Accordingly on 8 July the Admiralty ordered that she should be taken to pieces, and this was completed in the same month at a cost of £868-13-10d.
