= Hind-class sloop =

Class overview
- Operators: Royal Navy
- Preceded by: Merlin class
- Built: 1744–1744
- In commission: 1744–1772
- Completed: 4
- Lost: 2

General characteristics (common design)
- Type: Sloop-of-war
- Tons burthen: 266 20/94 bm
- Length: 91 ft 3 in (27.8 m) (gundeck); 75 ft 0 in (22.9 m) (keel)
- Beam: 25 ft 10 in (7.9 m)
- Depth of hold: 12 ft 2 in (3.71 m) (vessels without platform in hold)
- Sail plan: Snow brig
- Complement: 110 (raised to 125 when armament increased)
- Armament: 10 × 6-pounder guns (later increased to 14 x 6-pounder guns); also 14 x ½-pounder swivel guns

The Hind class was a class of four sloops of wooden construction built for the Royal Navy between 1743 and 1746. Two were built by contract with commercial builders to a common design prepared by Joseph Allin, then Master Shipwright at Deptford Dockyard (and from 1745 joint holder of the post of Surveyor of the Navy), and the other two were built in Deptford Dockyard under the supervision of Allin himself.

The first two - Hind and Vulture - were ordered on 6 August 1743 to be built to replace two ex-Spanish vessels (the Rupert's Prize and Pembroke's Prize, captured in 1741 and 1742 respectively, and put into service by the British); they were officially awarded their names on 18 April 1744. Although initially armed with ten 6-pounder guns, this class was built with seven pairs of gunports on the upper deck, enabling them to be re-armed with fourteen 6-pounders later in their careers.

Two more vessels to the same design - Jamaica and Trial - were ordered ten days later, on 18 August 1743 and were named on 13 July 1744; these were built under Allin's supervision at Deptford Dockyard, and were the only wartime sloops of this era to be built in a Royal Dockyard. In early 1754 the Trial was fitted with a mizzen mast at Deptford, thus making her a ship-sloop.

== Vessels ==
| Name | Ordered | Builder | Laid down | Launched | Completed | Fate |
|---|---|---|---|---|---|---|
| Hind | 6 August 1743 | Philemon Perry, Blackwall | 11 September 1743 | 19 April 1744 | 12 May 1744 | Lost 1 September 1747 off Louisbourg. |
| Vulture (written as Vulter) | 6 August 1743 | John Greaves, Limehouse | 16 September 1743 | 4 May 1744 | 24 May 1744 | Sold 30 January 1761 at Portsmouth. |
| Jamaica | 18 August 1743 | Deptford Dockyard | 15 September 1743 | 17 July 1744 | 28 August 1744 | Wrecked 27 January 1770 off Cuba. |
| Trial | 18 August 1743 | Deptford Dockyard | 15 September 1743 | 17 July 1744 | 9 August 1744 | Taken to pieces, completed 3 January 1776 at Woolwich. |

== Costs ==
Hind was built for £1,996.12.0d (a contract rate of £7.10.0d per ton) and then fitted out (at Woolwich Dyd) for a further £2,015.4.4d.
Vulture was also built for £1,996.12.0d (the same contract rate of £7.10.0d per ton) and then fitted out at Deptford Dyd for a further £1,864.10.9d.
Jamaica was built and fitted for £5,065.7.4d. Trial was built and fitted for £5,050.13.1d.

== See also ==
List of corvette and sloop classes of the Royal Navy
Drake-class sloops (1740)
Wolf-class sloops (1741)
Baltimore-class sloops (1742)
Merlin-class sloops - the other 'standard' sloop design of the 1743–1746 era.
