= HMS Trial (1744) =

Sloop of the Royal Navy

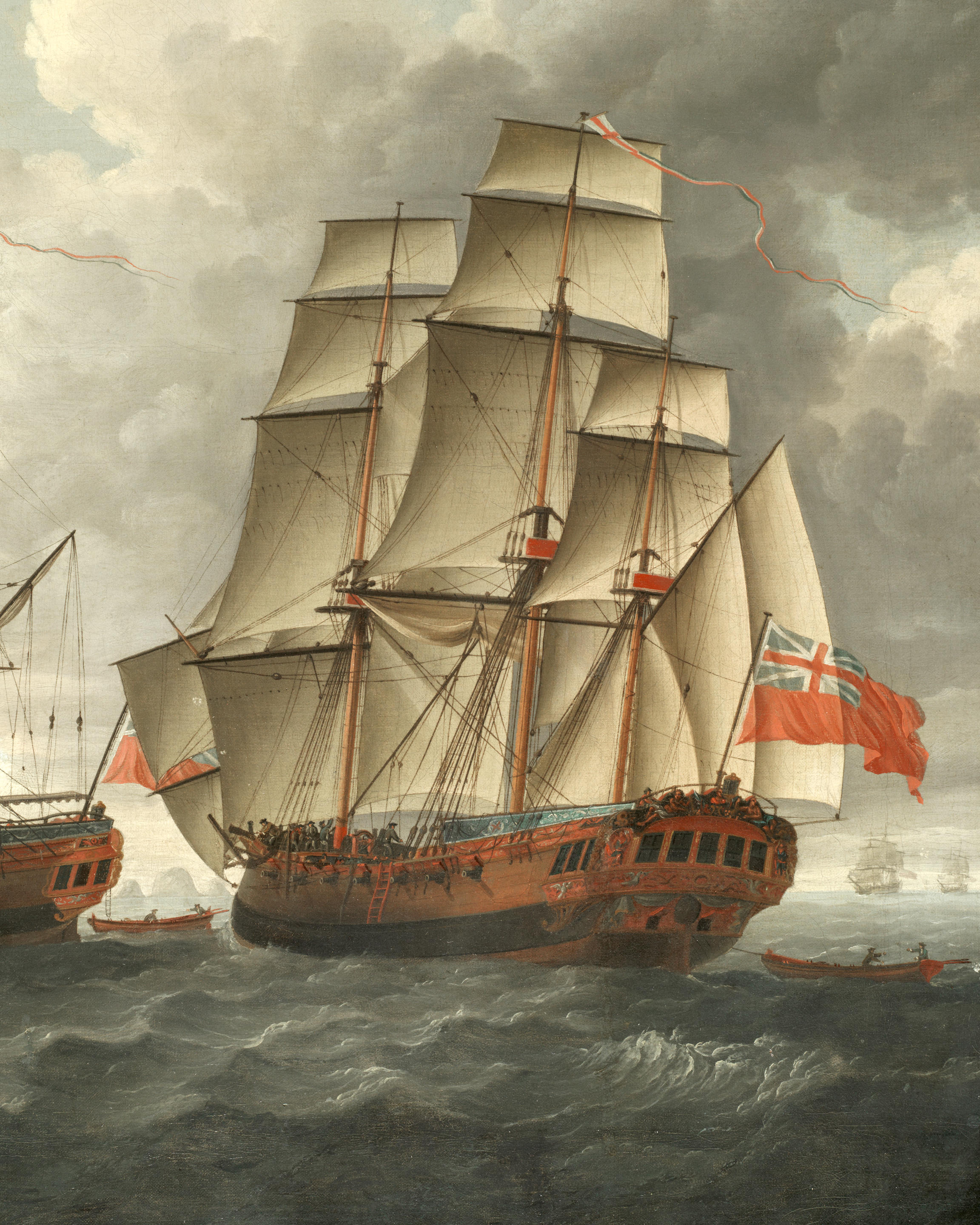
- HMS Tryall

History

Great Britain
- Name: HMS Trial
- Ordered: 18 August 1743
- Builder: Deptford Dockyard
- Laid down: 15 September 1743
- Launched: 17 July 1744
- Completed: 28 August 1744 at Deptford Dockyard
- Commissioned: July 1744
- Fate: Broken up at Woolwich on 3 January 1776

General characteristics
- Class & type: Hind-class sloop
- Tons burthen: 272 46/94 (bm)
- Length: 91 ft 6 in (27.9 m) (gundeck); 74 ft 11.75 in (22.9 m) (keel)
- Beam: 26 ft 1.75 in (8.0 m)
- Depth of hold: 12 ft 0.75 in (3.7 m)
- Sail plan: Snow brig
- Armament: 10 × 6-pounder guns, later increased to 14 × 6-pounder guns

HMS Trial or Tryall was a 10-gun (later 14-gun) two-masted Hind-class sloop of the Royal Navy, designed by Joseph Allin and built by him at Deptford Dockyard on the Thames River, England. She was launched on 17 July 1744. She and her sister ship, Jamaica, were the only sloops to be built in the Royal Dockyards between 1733 and 1748.

After more than 28 years of service, she was paid off at Woolwich Dockyard in August 1772, and broken up there on 3 January 1776.

== Construction ==
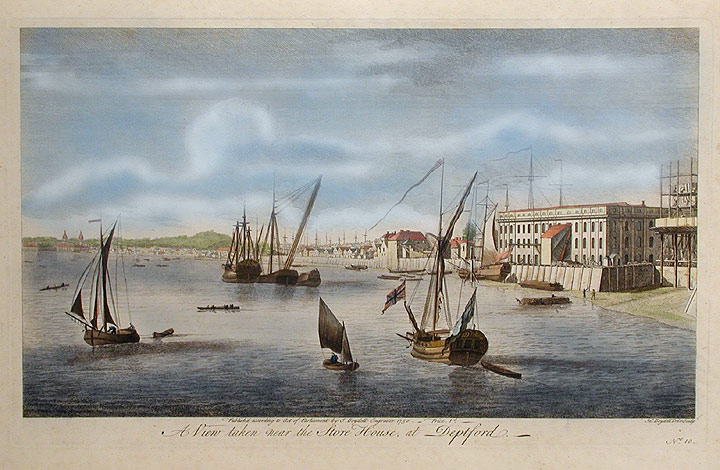
The waterfront at Deptford, where Trial was constructed in 1743–44.

Admiralty orders for Trial's construction were issued on 18 August 1743, with work commencing in September. Her dimensions were in keeping with other vessels of her class, as a two-masted snow-rigged brig, with a gundeck length of 91 ft 6 in (27.9 m) above a 74 ft 11.75 in (22.9 m) keel, a beam of 26 ft 1.75 in (8.0 m) and measuring 272 46/94 tons burthen. The initial construction costs were £5,050, including fittings.

Small repairs and refitting were conducted at Deptford Dockyard in 1754 and 1757, followed by more major works over ten months in 1767–68. The ship was initially armed with ten six-pounder cannons and 14 1/2-pounder swivel guns, with a complement of 110 men. In 1748, the number of six-pounder cannons was increased to 14, and an extra 15 men were added to the crew.

== Naval service ==
=== War of the Austrian Succession ===
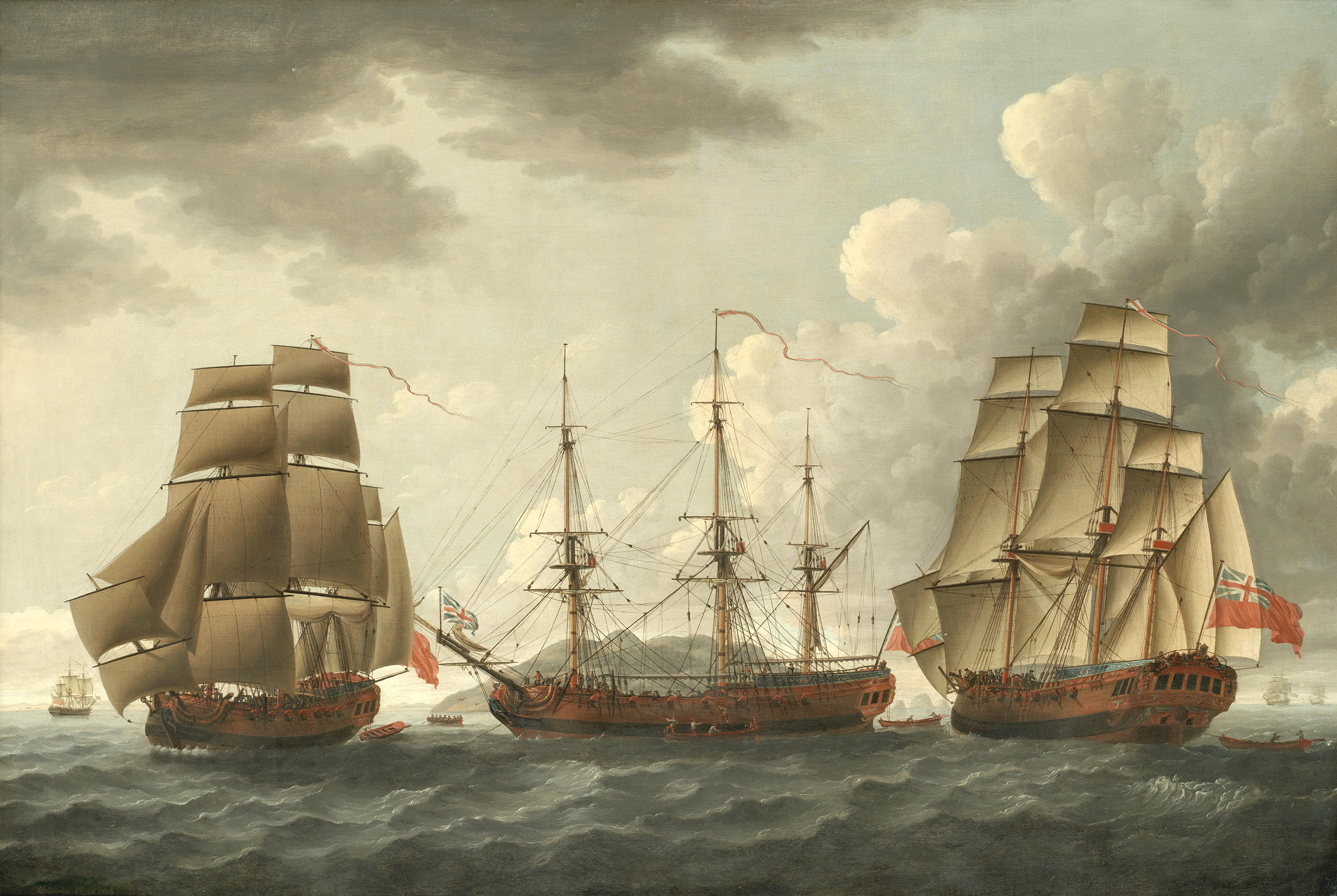
Tryall in three positions, off Antigua, by John Cleveley the Elder, 1764

Trial was commissioned in July 1744 and launched on 9 November for service in the ongoing War of the Austrian Succession. The British naval blockade of France had been broken at the Battle of Toulon in February of that year, and Trial was sent to patrol the northern coastline of England for signs of French or Spanish ships. The voyage was not a success; after five days at sea, Trial encountered heavy weather and ran aground at Lindisfarne. A salvage crew was eventually able to drag her off shore, and she was returned southward to await reassignment.

In the spring of 1745, she returned to sea under Commander Richard Barry, with orders to guard the British whaling fleet en route to Spitzbergen. Returning southward in October, Trial engaged and defeated the San Ziraco, a 10-gun Spanish privateer. Barry was transferred to another vessel shortly afterward, and replaced by Commander Robert Haldane. Under Haldane's command, Trial took part in an unsuccessful hunt for French vessels off the Outer Hebrides, including the pursuit of two enemy men-of-war sighted near Stornoway in May.

Haldane left the ship in February 1748 and was replaced by Commander Edward Le Cras. Peace with France was declared in April, and Trial was moved from active service into three uneventful years as a convoy escort in the Mediterranean and off Nova Scotia. Her years at sea had left her in need of repair, and she was paid off in 1752, with her crew and commander discharged to other vessels. After a year tied up at Deptford Dockyard, she underwent repairs to her hull and fittings in 1754, for a cost of £3,046.

=== Seven Years' War ===
Trial was recommissioned in March 1754 under Commander John Falkingham. War with France was again imminent, and in June Trial was sent to the British Leeward Islands to assist in defending British settlements in the Caribbean and North America. On arrival, a number of her crew were reported as sick or infirm and were discharged ashore in Georgia, with their care funded by a colonial government grant of £113. In September 1757, Trial was surveyed and returned to Deptford for repairs, which were completed by November at a cost of £1,647. She returned to the Caribbean in March 1758 under Commander Thomas Cookson. The voyage was marred by open dissent between Cookson and the first lieutenant, George Johnstone, culminating in a failed attempt by Johnstone to have his commander court-martialled for incompetent sailing.

Trial continued her Caribbean patrols, but was generally surplus to requirements and was decommissioned in October 1759. Restored to service in November 1761 under Commander James Cunningham, she was assigned to cruising and patrolling in the English Channel until the declaration of peace with France in February 1763.

=== Later service ===
"... the Tryal, sloop, lately taken into the dock at Deptford to be repaired, may when completed be a proper vessel for this service ..."

— Navy Board to Admiralty, proposing Trial as Captain Cook's ship for his first voyage to the Pacific, 8 March 1768

In April 1764 Trial was recommissioned under Commander James Wallace. She sailed for the Bahamas two months later. Her years of active service had taken their toll, however, and she was decommissioned again in September. An extensive refit was required, but no progress was made for three years, despite a fresh naval survey in October 1766. Repairs finally commenced in December 1767, lasting eleven months and costing £5,442, significantly more than the original construction cost of the ship.

Despite her small size, Trial was selected in March 1768 as the Navy Board's choice for Captain James Cook's first voyage to the Pacific and subsequent circumnavigation of the Earth. Her selection rested on an assessment of her sturdiness, given the likely length of the voyage, and the lack of similar vessels in port and in reasonable repair.

In order to prepare her, the Board proposed that she be fitted with a spar deck over the main decking and copper sheathing along the hull, and that her armament be reduced to six carriage guns and eight swivels in order to make room for additional stores. After some debate, the Lords of the Admiralty declined to approve the Board's recommendation, indicating that the suggested refit would take too long to complete. On 27 March 1768, the Navy Board instead selected the Whitby collier Earl of Pembroke, commissioning her into the Navy as HM Bark Endeavour.

Trial was instead returned to the Caribbean under Commander William Phillips, reaching Jamaica in January 1769. Phillips died in 1771 and was succeeded by Lieutenant (later Admiral) Thomas Mackenzie, serving in his first command. Following an uneventful final year of service, Trial was decommissioned in August 1772 and returned to England. She was broken up at Woolwich Dockyard in January 1776, and her timbers distributed to other vessels.

== Bibliography ==
- Colledge, J. J.; Warlow, Ben (2006) [1969]. Ships of the Royal Navy: The Complete Record of All Fighting Ships of the Royal Navy from the 15th Century to the Present (3rd Rev ed.). London: Chatham Publishing. ISBN 978-1-86176-281-8. OCLC 67375475.
- McLaughlan, Ian. The Sloop of War 1650–1763. Seaforth Publishing, 2014. ISBN 978-1-84832-187-8.
- Rif Winfield (2007). British Warships in the Age of Sail, 1714–1792: Design, Construction, Careers and Fates. Seaforth Publishing. ISBN 978-1-84415-700-6.
