= HMS Scorpion (1746) =

18th-century sloop of the British Royal Navy

History

Great Britain
- Name: HMS Scorpion
- Ordered: 5 April 1745
- Builder: James Wyatt and John Major, Bucklers Hard
- Laid down: April 1745
- Launched: 8 July 1746
- Completed: 6 September 1746 at Portsmouth Dockyard
- Commissioned: June 1746
- Fate: Foundered in the Irish Sea on 23 September 1762

General characteristics
- Class & type: Merlin-class sloop
- Tons burthen: 276 31/94 (bm)
- Length: 91 ft 2 in (27.8 m) (gundeck); 74 ft 11 in (22.8 m) (keel)
- Beam: 26 ft 4 in (8.0 m)
- Depth of hold: 12 ft 0 in (3.7 m)
- Sail plan: Snow brig
- Armament: 10 × 6-pounder guns initially, increased to 14 × 6-pounder guns from 1748

HMS Scorpion was a 14-gun two-masted Merlin-class sloop of the Royal Navy, built by Wyatt and Major at Bucklers Hard on the Beaulieu River in Hampshire, England and launched on 8 July 1746.

She foundered in the Irish Sea in September 1762.
