= Merlin-class sloop =

Class of sloops-of-war in the Royal Navy

Class overview
- Operators: Royal Navy
- Preceded by: Baltimore class
- Succeeded by: Hind class
- Built: 1744–1746
- In commission: 1744–1780
- Completed: 21
- Lost: 7

General characteristics (common design)
- Type: Sloop-of-war
- Tons burthen: 268 77/94 bm
- Length: 91 ft 0 in (27.7 m) (gundeck); 74 ft 9 in (22.8 m) (keel)
- Beam: 26 ft 0 in (7.9 m)
- Depth of hold: 12 ft 0 in (3.66 m) (vessels without platform in hold); 6 ft 10 in (2.08 m) (vessels with platform in hold)
- Sail plan: Snow brig
- Complement: 110 (raised to 125 when armament increased)
- Armament: 10 × 6-pounder guns (later increased to 14 x 6-pounder guns); also 14 x ½-pounder swivel guns

The Merlin class was a class of twenty-one sloops of wooden construction built for the Royal Navy between 1743 and 1746. They were all built by contract with commercial builders to a common design prepared by Jacob Acworth, the Surveyor of the Navy; however, there were small differences between individual vessels, with a platform deck being constructed in the hold in Swallow (i), Merlin, Raven and Swallow (ii), whereas the other seventeen had no platform deck and thus their depth in hold was thus nearly twice as much.

The Merlin class design was one of two standard designs to which all Royal Navy sloops were built between 1743 and 1748 (the other design being the Hind class designed by Acworth's colleague Joseph Allin), who was appointed to share the post of Surveyor with Acworth on 11 July 1745.

Although initially each was armed with ten 6-pounder guns, this class was built with seven pairs of gunports on the upper deck, enabling them to be re-armed with fourteen 6-pounders later in their careers.

The first two – Swallow and Merlin – were ordered on 7 July 1743 to be built to replace two ex-Spanish vessels (the Galgo and Peregrine's Prize, both captured in 1742, and put into service by the British). Two more vessels to the same design were ordered on 30 March 1744; another two were ordered five days later, four more followed on 23 May and three others were ordered later that year.

On 5 April 1745 five more were ordered – including a second Falcon (named to replace the first, captured in the same year) and a second Swallow (similarly to replace the first, wrecked in 1744) – and a single extra vessel was ordered on 11 April. A final pair were ordered on 9 January 1746.

== Vessels ==
Name	Ordered	Builder	Laid down	Launched	Completed	Fate
Swallow (i)	7 July 1743	John Buxton, Jnr., Deptford	30 July 1743	17 February 1744	25 March 1744	Wrecked 24 December 1744 in the Bahamas.
Merlin	7 July 1743	Greville & Whetsone, Limehouse	1 August 1743	20 March 1744	30 March 1744	Sold 16 November 1748 at Plymouth.
Speedwell	30 March 1744	John Buxton, Jnr., Deptford	April 1744	9 November 1744	19 January 1745	Sold 13 November 1750 at Deptford.
Falcon (i)	30 March 1744	John Barnard, Harwich	15 May 1744	12 November 1744	22 January 1745	Captured by the French 28 September 1745, retaken 6 March 1746 and renamed Fortune, sold 20 March 1770 at Woolwich.
Hazard	4 April 1744	John Buxton, Snr., Rotherhithe	26 April 1744	11 December 1744	2 March 1745	Captured by the Jacobites 24 November 1745 and handed over to the French; retaken 25 March 1746, sold 7 September 1749 at Deptford.
Lizard	4 April 1744	Philemon Ewer, Bursledon	n/a	22 December 1744	14 February 1745	Wrecked 27 February 1748 in the Isles of Scilly.
Hinchingbrooke	23 May 1744	Moody Janvrin, Bursledon	n/a	8 March 1745	17 April 1745	Captured by the French 10 December 1746 off Berry Head.
Tavistock	23 May 1744	John Darley, Gosport	n/a	22 March 1745	19 April 1745	Renamed Albany on 20 August 1747, sold 3 May 1763 at Woolwich.
Hound	23 May 1744	Daniel Stow & Benjamin Bartlett, Shoreham	?September 1744	22 May 1745	27 July 1745	Sold 27 October 1773 at Deptford.
Hornet	23 May 1744	Chitty & Quallett, Chichester	September 1744	3 August 1745	13 October 1745	Sold 3 April 1770 at Chatham Dockyard.
Raven	27 August 1744	Hugh Blaydes, Hull	September 1744	4 July 1745	2 October 1745	Sold 31 March 1763 at Deptford.
Swan	6 October 1744	Thomas Hinks, Chester	November 1744	14 December 1745	14 December 1745	Sold 31 March 1763 at Sheerness.
Badger	10 October 1744	Moody Janvrin, Bursledon	20 December 1744	5 August 1745	4 October 1745	Wrecked 24 September 1762 in the Orkney Islands.
Falcon (ii)	5 April 1745	William Alexander, Rotherhithe	April 1745	30 November 1745	9 February 1746	Wrecked 19 April 1759 on the Îles des Saintes, off Guadeloupe.
Scorpion	5 April 1745	James Wyatt and John Major, Buckler's Hard	April 1745	8 July 1746	6 September 1746	Wrecked 23 September 1762 off the Isle of Man.
Swallow (ii)	5 April 1745	Henry Bird, Rotherhithe	May 1745	14 December 1745	12 February 1746	Sold 20 June 1769 at Deptford.
Kingfisher	5 April 1745	John Darley, Gosport	May 1745	12 December 1745	10 February 1746	Sold 3 May 1763 at Woolwich.
Dispatch	5 April 1744	Daniel Stow & Benjamin Bartlett, Shoreham	May 1745	30 December 1745	26 April 1746	Sold 27 October 1773 at Deptford.
Viper	11 April 1745	Tito Durrell, Poole	1 June 1745	11 June 1746	9 August 1746	Converted to a fireship and renamed Lightning on 29 July 1755; sold 30 December 1762 at Woolwich.
Grampus	9 January 1746	John Reed, Hull	February 1746	3 November 1746	14 February 1747	Converted to a fireship in early 1762 and renamed Strombolo on 6 March 1771; hulked as a prison ship at New York City in September 1780 and sold there later the same year.
Saltash	9 January 1746	John Quallett & John Allin, Rotherhithe	February 1746	19 December 1746	6 February 1747	Sold 15 February 1763 at Deptford.

== See also ==
- List of corvette and sloop classes of the Royal Navy
- Drake-class sloops (1740)
- Wolf-class sloops (1741)
- Baltimore-class sloops (1742)
- Hind-class sloops - the other 'standard' sloop design of the 1743–1746 era.
