= Raid on Samaná =

- Part of the Caribbean campaign of 1803–1810
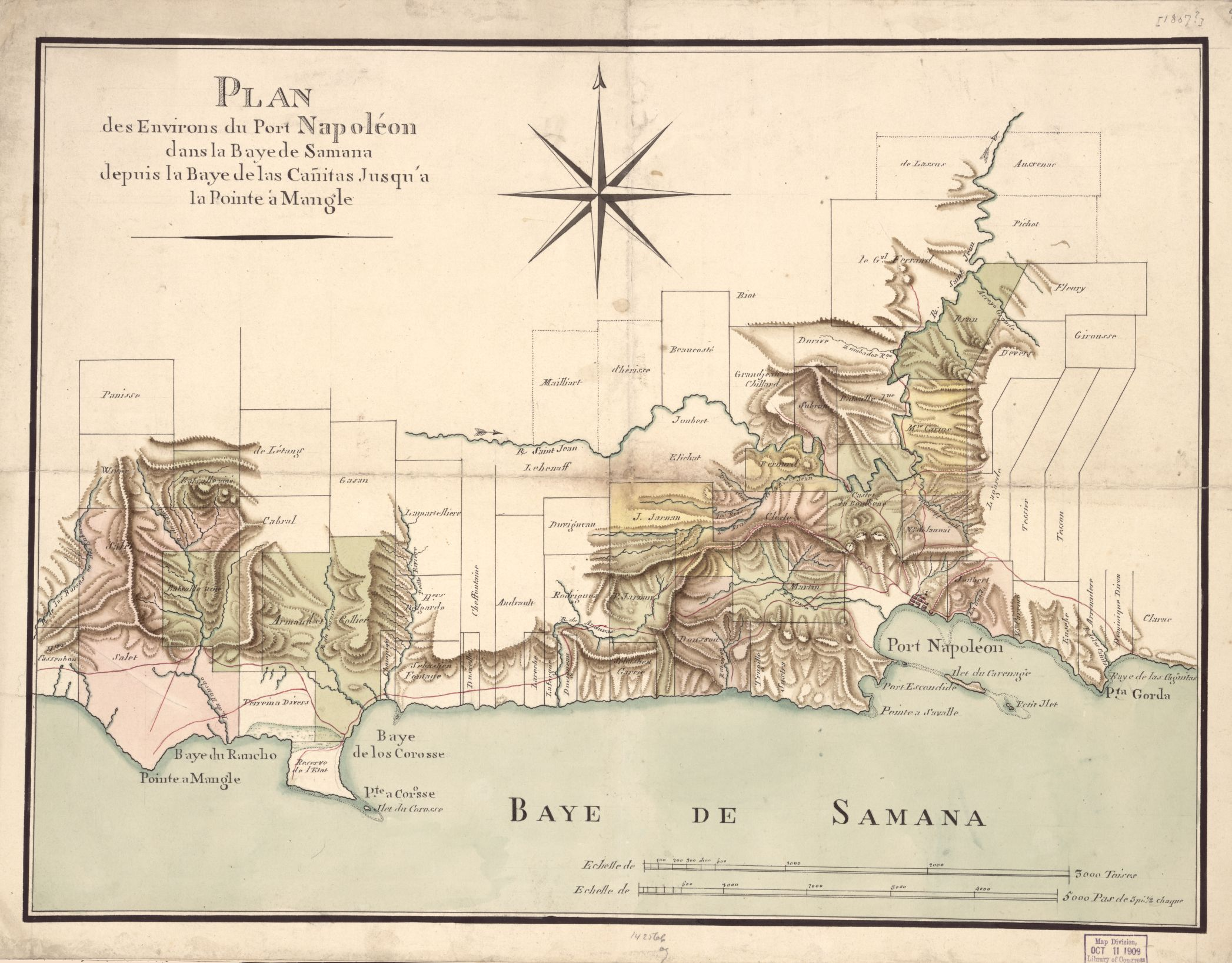
- Port Napoléon in the Bay of Samana on Santo Domingo
Date	14 February 1807
Location	Samaná, Santo Domingo
Result	British victory

Belligerents
United Kingdom	France

Commanders and leaders
James Richard Dacres	unknown

Strength
2 frigates	1 Fort; 5 ships & prizes

Casualties and losses
2 killed 16 wounded	1 fort destroyed 3 schooners captured 2 prizes captured

The Raid on Samaná was a land and naval action where two Royal Navy ships attacked the French held port of Samaná in Santo Domingo on 14 February 1807 during the Napoleonic Wars. They captured and burned a fort and then captured a number of ships which included two prizes with only light losses.

== Events ==
Commander James Richard Dacres in the Dacres 24-gun HMS Bacchante had been sailing off the French occupied part of Santo Domingo in early 1807. On 14 February 1807, Bacchante captured the French navy schooner Dauphin off Cape Raphael after a 10-hour chase. Dauphin mounted one long 12-pounder gun and two 4-pounders, but she threw the 4-pounders overboard during the chase. She had a crew of 71 men and Dacres was extremely happy to have captured her as she had been preying successfully on British trade.

He then fell in with Captain Wise and Mediator in the Mona Passage. Both were patrolling, looking for French warships and privateers, so Dacres took Mediator under his command and hatched a plan to raid the port of Samana, "that nest of privateers". Dacres had Dauphin come into the harbour there under her French flag, with Bacchante disguised as her prize, and Mediator, a former merchantman, appearing to be a neutral ship. This stratagem permitted the British vessels to navigate into the harbour and anchor within a half a mile of the fort before the French realized that they were British vessels. A four-hour exchange of fire with a fort manned primarily by men from the privateers in the harbour then commenced. Soon after the fort was assaulted in a land attack by the seamen and Royal Marines from Bacchante and Mediator, the landing party being under Wise's command.

The fort was captured and soon the French fled. The British consolidated their position and captured two French schooners undergoing fitting as privateers, and an American ship (George Washington, whose cargo of coffee was still aboard her) and a British schooner, both prizes to French privateers.

Before they left on 21 February, the British destroyed the fort and its guns and plundered the settlement taking anything of value. In the attack, Dacres had four men wounded while Wise had two men killed and twelve wounded as Mediator had been more heavily engaged than Bacchante in the exchange of fire with the fort. Dacres estimated that French casualties had been high, but did not have a number as the Frenchmen took to the woods as the fort fell.

The Lloyd's Patriotic Fund, subsequently awarded both Dacres and Wise a sword each worth £100 that bore the inscriptions:

- "From the Patriotic Fund at Lloyd's to James Richard Dacres Esqr. Capt. of H.M.S. Bacchante for his Gallant Conduct in the Capture of the French National Schooner Dauphin and the Destruction of the Fort and Cannon in the Harbour of Samana on 16th February 1807 effected by the Bacchante in company with H.M.S. Mediator as Recorded in the London Gazette of the 25th of April".
- "From the Patriotic Fund at Lloyd's to William Furlong Wise Esq. Capt. of H.M.S. Mediator for his Gallant Conduct in Storming and Destroying with the Seamen and Marines belonging to His Majesty's Ships Bacchante and Mediator the Fort and Cannon in the Harbour of Samana on 16th of February 1807 as Recorded in the London Gazette of the 25th of April".
