= HMS Scout =

Twelve ships of the Royal Navy have borne the name HMS Scout:

- HMS Scout (1577) was a 10-gun bark launched in 1577 and condemned in 1603.
- HMS Scout (1648) was a 6-gun sloop launched in 1648 and captured in 1649 by the Royalists.
- HMS Scout (1694) was a 6-gun advice boat launched in 1694 and sold in 1703.
- HMS Scout (1780) was a 16-gun brig-sloop launched in 1780 after having been purchased on the stocks. The French frigates Alceste and Vestale captured her on 4 August 1794 off Cape Bon (or Bona); the French took her into service as Scout, but she was wrecked on 12 December 1795 off Cadiz.
- HMS Scout was an 18-gun sloop, previously the French corvette Vénus, captured on 22 October 1800 and wrecked on 25 March 1801 off the Isle of Wight with no loss of life.
- HMS Scout was a sloop, previously the French 14-gun privateer Premier Consul. HMS Dryad captured her on 5 March 1801; she foundered in 1801 or 1802 off Newfoundland with the loss of all hands.
- HMS Scout (1804) was an 18-gun Cruizer-class brig-sloop launched in 1804 and sold in 1827. She then became the whaler Diana, which made four whaling voyages between 1829 and April 1843 when she was condemned following an on-board explosion.
- HMS Scout (1832) was an 18-gun sloop launched in 1832 and broken up in 1852.
- HMS Scout (1856) was a wooden screw corvette launched in 1856 and broken up in 1877.
- HMS Scout (1861) was a coastguard cutter built in 1861 and sold in 1870.
- HMS Scout (1885) was a torpedo cruiser launched in 1885 and sold in 1904.
- HMS Scout (1918) was an S-class destroyer launched in 1918 and broken up in 1946.
