= James Dacres =

James Dacres may refer to:

- James Richard Dacres (1749–1810), Royal Navy admiral
- James Richard Dacres (1788–1853), his son, Royal Navy admiral
