= French brig Griffon =

History

France
- Name: Griffon
- Namesake: Griffon
- Ordered: 30 April 1804
- Builder: Rochefort (Constructeurs: Jean-Baptiste Lemoyne-Sérigny, then Pierre Rolland)
- Laid down: 5 April 1805
- Launched: 2 June 1806
- Completed: August 1806
- Captured: June 1808

United Kingdom
- Name: HMS Griffon
- Acquired: June 1808 by capture
- Honours and awards: Naval General Service Medal with clasp "Griffon 27 March 1812"
- Fate: Sold 1819

United Kingdom
- Name: Griffon, or Griffin
- Owner: Hills & Co.
- Acquired: 1819 by purchase
- Fate: Returned from whaling in 1850; no further mention

General characteristics
- Class & type: Palinure-class brig
- Tons burthen: 345, or 349, or 368, (Note: Using a modern calculator and the data on length and breadth yields 34269/94 (bm).) (bm)
- Length: 92 ft 6 in (28.2 m) (overall); 80 ft 10 in (24.6 m) (keel)
- Beam: 29 ft 4 in (8.9 m)
- Depth of hold: 8 ft 2 in (2.5 m)
- Sail plan: Brig
- Complement: French service:105; British service:100
- Armament: French service: 14 × 24-pounder carronades + 2 × 6-pounder guns; British service: 14 × 24-pounder carronades + 2 × 6-pounder bow chasers

The French brig Griffon, was a Pallinure-class brig launched in 1806. After HMS Bacchante captured Griffon in 1808, the Royal Navy took her into service. Griffon participated in one action that resulted in her crew being awarded the Naval General Service Medal. Two of her officers were subject to notable courts martial, one for murder and one for smuggling, with the murderer being hanged and the smuggler dismissed the Navy. The Navy sold Griffon in 1819 to Hills & Co., who proceeded to use her as a London-based whaler. She sailed to the South Seas fishery under some under different masters. Hill & Co. then sold her to Wilson & Co. who employed her on one last whaling voyage that ended in 1850.

== French career ==
From 17 March to 4 November 1806, Griffon, under the command of lieutenant de vaisseau Jacques Gautier, was at Rochefort and the Bay of Aiguillon. Then she served in the roads of the Ile d'Aix between March and August 1807. Finally, in early 1808 she carried troops from Rochefort to Martinique.

On the way Griffon encountered one or more British frigates. The frigate may have been Acasta, and according to the same report, Griffon was in company with the French brigs Palinure and Pilade. On 17 March Griffon took refuge at Marin, Martinique. Palinure and Pilade sailed on to the roads at Trinité.

On 27 March 1808 the boats of Ulysses, Castor, Hippomenes and Morne Fortunee attempted to cut out Griffon from Marin. They succeeded in capturing a battery but Griffon's fire drove them back empty handed, and with heavy casualties. Later, Griffon continued on to Fort-de-France.

== Capture ==
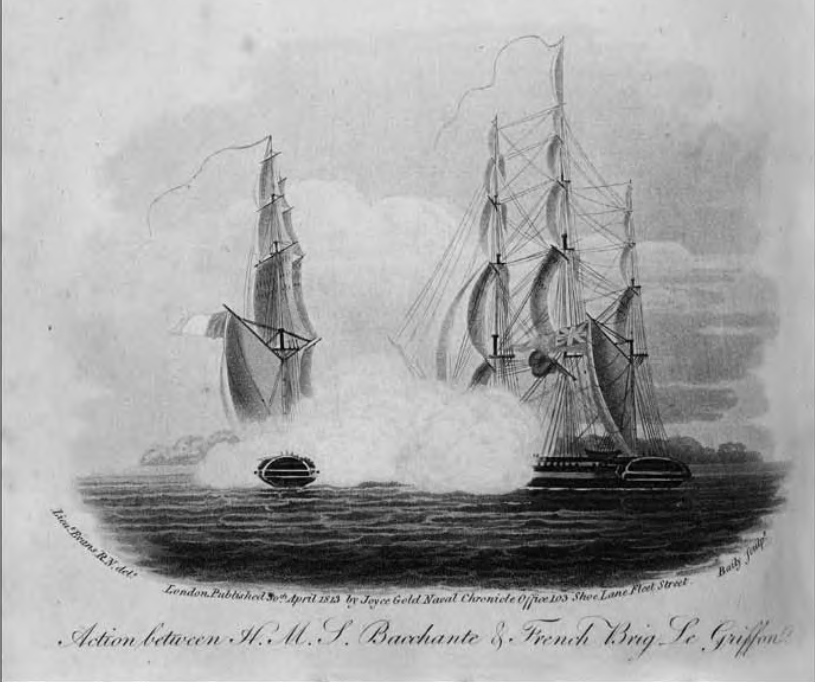
Action between HMS Bacchante and French Brig Le Griffon, sketched by Lieut. Evans

On 11 May 1808 Bacchante captured Griffon off Cape Antonio. Bacchante pursued Griffon for almost seven hours, and fought her for a half an hour. Griffon only struck when she found herself crowded some 100 metres from the breakers with Bacchante only some 200 meters from her. Griffon was still under Gautier's command. In the engagement Griffon had five men wounded, while Bacchante suffered no casualties.

Griffon, of 16 guns and 120 men, had sailed from Rochefort to Martinique, and was returning to France via Pensacola. Bacchante sent her into Jamaica.

== Royal Navy career ==
The Navy commissioned Griffon at Jamaica under Lieutenant Henry Spark Jones. Lieutenant Allen, or Lieutenant T.P.J. Parry, replaced him in December 1808.

Griffon was among the vessels that carried out the blockade of the city of Santo Domingo that accompanied the siege, and was present on 6 July 1809 at its surrender. (Note: In January 1826 prize money was paid for stores captured at Santo Domingo. A first-class share was worth £7 10s 11d; a sixth-class share, that of an ordinary seaman, was worth 2s 5d. In October 1832, prize money was paid for the ordnance stores. A first-class share was worth £67 3s 5d; a sixth-class share was worth £1 1s 3d.) Griffon's captain at Santo Domingo was Lieutenant J. Gore (acting).

Griffon arrived at Sheerness on 10 October 1809. She then underwent fitting at Chatham between February 1810 and December 1811. Commander John Tannock recommissioned her in November 1811, but handed over command to Commander George Trollope in February 1812.

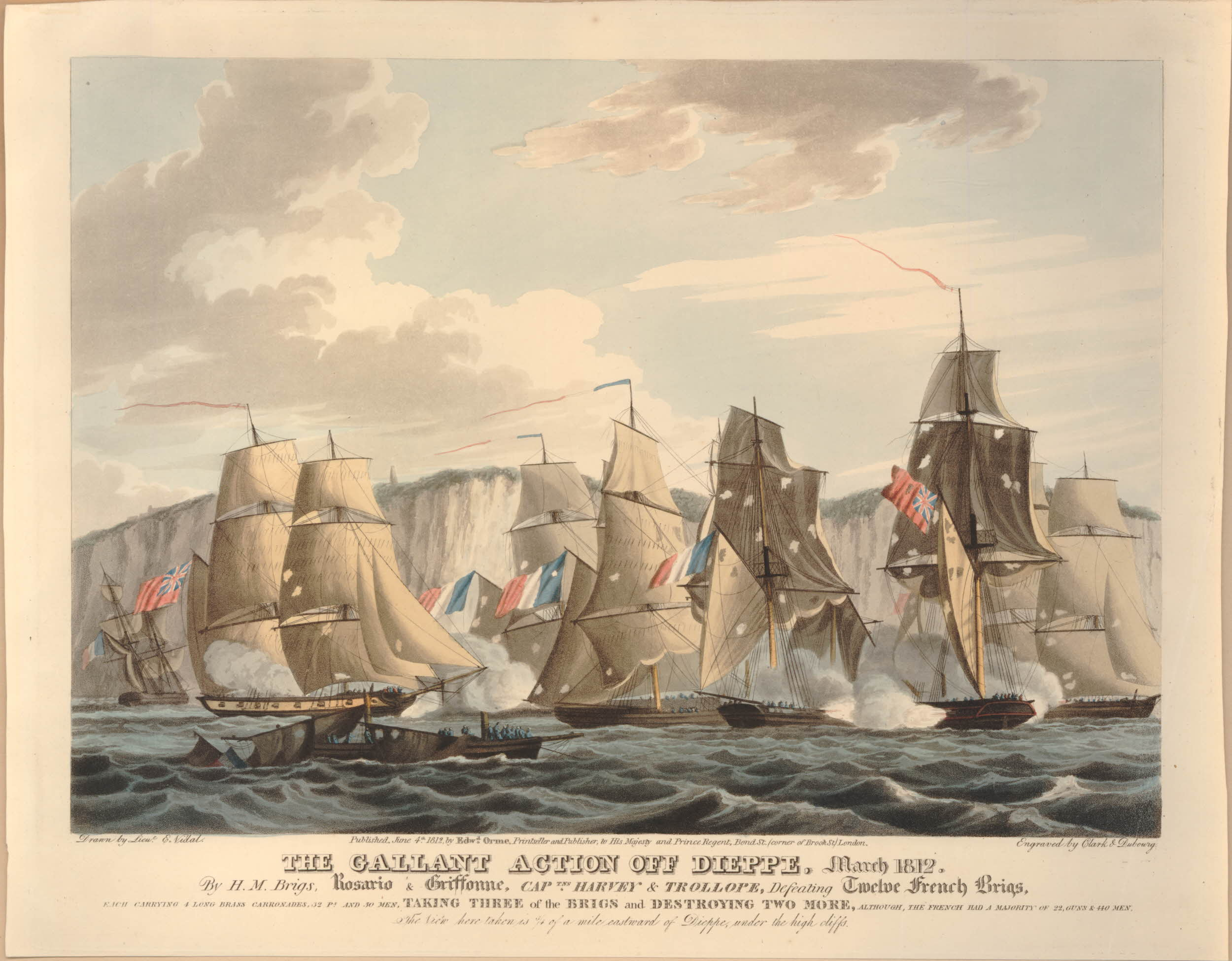
The gallant action off Dieppe, March 1812, by Emeric Essex Vidal

On 27 March, near Dieppe, Griffon and Rosario intercepted a 13-strong flotilla heading there from Boulogne-sur-Mer. The two British vessels engaged them closely, capturing three brigs (praams Nos. 95, 246, and 314), and driving two more onto the shore. Each French brig was armed with three 24-pounder guns and an 8" howitzer. The British casualties amounted to one officer and four men wounded. The British sent their prizes into Plymouth.

In 1847 the Admiralty awarded the Naval General Service Medal with clasps "Griffon 27 March 1812" and "Rosario 27 March 1812" to the five surviving claimants from Griffon and the seven from Rosario. (Note: The listing in the London Gazette mistakenly gives the name of Rosario's commander as "Trollope", and Griffon's commander as "Hervey".)

Lieutenant Richard Steward Gamage joined Griffon in July as her first lieutenant. On 10 September the Milford, Mann, master, put into Ramsgate. She had been sailing from Chepstow to Deptford when she ran foul of Griffin and lost her foremast and suffered other damage.

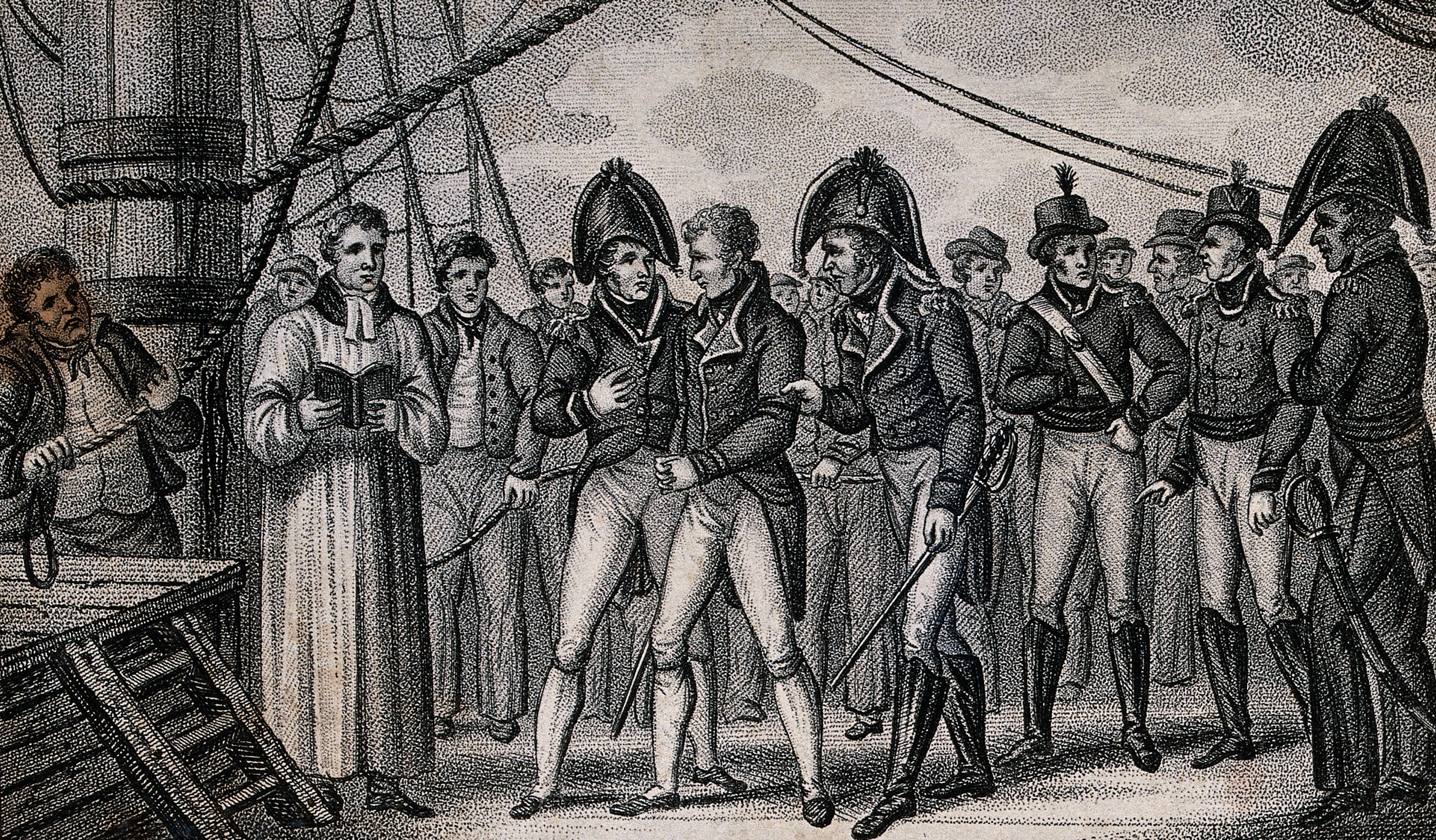
Lieutenant Gamage is lead to the scaffold to be executed

On 20 October Griffon was in the Downs and Gamage was in command, Trollope having gone ashore. Gamage was a mild man who, in a sudden and uncharacteristic fit of rage, stabbed an insubordinate sergeant of Marines to death with a sword thrust. A court martial on 27 October found Gamage guilty of murder and sentenced him to hang. Appeals for clemency, including from the crew, were rejected and Gamage was hanged on 23 November from Griffon's yardarm. As was customary, all vessels in the Downs sent two boats alongside Griffon to witness the execution; the men who remained on the vessels were required to watch from the decks of their vessels.

That December a report appeared in the press that Griffon's crew had mutinied and sailed her to Boulogne. The petty officers, seamen, and marines of the crew wrote a letter to Trollope, subsequently published, affirming their satisfaction with him and their other officers.

In June 1814 Commander George Hewson replaced Trollope, who had been promoted to post captain on 7 June.

=== Post-war ===
Commander James A. Murray assumed command in May 1816.

On 20 September Lieutenant William Elliot Wright was appointed acting commander at Saint Helena. (Note: For more on William Elliot Wright see: O'Byrne, William R. (1849). "Wright, William Elliot" . A Naval Biographical Dictionary. London: John Murray.) On Griffon's return to Britain Wright's appointment was confirmed on 20 August 1817. However, Wright then underwent a court martial for having smuggled 53 yards of crepe and other contraband while Griffon was at Portsmouth. The court ordered Wright dismissed the service. However, he was reinstated in 1819 without loss of rank.

In March 1819, the Commissioners of the Navy put Griffon up for sale at Deptford. They sold her to Hills & Co. for £1,700 on 11 March 1819.

== Whaler ==
Lloyd's Register (LR) for 1819 showed a Griffon, French-built sloop, 9 [sic] years old, and 345 tons (bm), with owner Hills & Co.; later, the entry gave her burthen as 349 tons. This vessel continued in commercial service for Hills & Co. for some 27 years. The last year with an entry for this vessel was 1846, and that entry was without a trade route. A database on whaling shows that Griffin was a whaler and that she returned from her last voyage in 1850.

Year	Master	Owner	Trade	Notes
1819	C. Worth	Hills & Co.	London & South Seas	Left Britain for Peru on 10 September 1819
1820	C. Worth	Hills & Co.	London & South Seas	
1821	C. Worth	Hills & Co.	London & South Seas	
1822	C. Worth	Hill & Co.	London & South Seas	Returned to Britain on 23 August 1822 with 500 casks of whale oil, plus baleen
1823	Garbutt	Hill & Co.	London & South Seas	Left Britain for Timor and "The Japans" on 1 October 1822
1824	Garbutt	Hill & Co.	London & South Seas	
1825	Garbutt	Hill & Co.	London & South Seas	Returned to Britain on 3 October 1825 with 520 casks of whale oil
1826	Garbett	Hill & Co.	London & South Seas	Rampant misprinting in Lloyd's Register; legible entry in Register of Shipping; Left Britain on 1 April 1826 with Gibson, master
1827	Garbutt	Hill & Co.	London & South Seas	
1828	Garbutt	Hill & Co.	London & South Seas	Returned to Britain on 20 September 1828 with 520 casks, plus tanks
1829	Garbutt	Hill & Co.	London & South Seas	Left Britain on 3 January 1829 for the Seychelles with Nesbitt, master; later Wright
1830	Nesbitt	Hill & Co.	London & South Seas	
1831	Nesbitt	Hill & Co., or A & J Hill; Hill, Boulcott & Co.	London & South Seas	Returned to Britain on 4 May 1831 with 530 casks On 14 August 1831 Captain Wright sailed Griffin for the Seychelles
1832	Wright	A & J Hill	London & South Seas	On 12 February 1832 she sailed from St Helena, bound for London and having come from the Seychelles
1833	Wright	A & J Hill	London & South Seas	Griffin was reported to have been at Praslin, in the Seychelles, on 16 July 1833 with 1900 barrels.
1834	P. Wright	A & J Hill	London & South Seas	Griffin returned from the Seychelles in June with 162 tons of oil. On 17 October 1834 W. Daleney (or Delaney), sailed Griffin to New Guinea
1835	W. Debrey	A & J Hill	London & South Seas	
1836	W. Debrey	A & J Hill	London & South Seas	
1837	W. Debrey	Hills & Co.	London & South Seas	
1838	W. Debrey	A & J Hill	London & South Seas	Griffin returned to Britain on 21 May 1838 with 580 casks of oil
1839	W. Debrey	A & J Hill	London & South Seas	On 18 July 1839 William E. Parsons sailed for Timor
1840	Parsons	A & J Hill	London & South Seas	
1841	Parsons	Hills & Co.	London & South Seas	
1842	Parsons	Hills & Co.	London & South Seas	
1843	Parsons	Hill, Boulcott & Co.	London & South Seas	Parsons and Griffin returned to Britain on 27 February 1843 with 180 casks of oil and one cask of ambergris On 25 July 1843 Griffin sailed for Timor again
1844	Parsons	Hill & Co.	London & South Seas	
1845	Parsons	Hill & Co.	London & South Seas	
1846	Parsons	Hill & Co.		
1847	John Jarman	Wilson & Co.		No further entries in Lloyd's Register; On 23 March 1847 Griffin returned to Britain with 130 tons of whale oil On 14 August 1847
1850				On 4 November 1850 Jarman and Griffin returned to Britain with 320 casks of oil
