= HMS Elk (1804) =

Brig-sloop of the Royal Navy

History

United Kingdom
- Name: HMS Elk
- Ordered: 22 May 1805
- Builder: (Mrs) Frances Barnard, Sons & Co., Deptford
- Laid down: June 1804
- Launched: 22 August 1804
- Commissioned: September 1804
- Fate: Broken up in 1812

General characteristics >
- Type: Cruizer-class brig-sloop
- Tons burthen: 382 90/94 bm
- Length: 100 ft 1 in (30.5 m) (gundeck); 77 ft 4 3/4 in (23.6 m) (keel)
- Beam: 30 ft 6 in (9.3 m)
- Depth of hold: 12 ft 9 in (3.9 m)
- Sail plan: Brig rigged
- Complement: 121
- Armament: 16 × 32-pounder carronades + 2 × 6-pounder bow guns

HMS Elk was a Cruizer-class brig-sloop, built of pine, and launched in 1804. She served on the Jamaica station where she captured a number of privateers. She was broken up in 1812.

== Service ==
Elk was built of fir (pine) which made for speedier construction at the cost of reduced durability in service. She was commissioned in September 1804 under Commander William Woolridge. Then in November Commander Randall McDonnell took over command and sailed her for Jamaica on 20 January 1805. On 6 May, Elk and Franchise captured the Hazard. Twelve days later, the two captured the Globe.

In October Commander James Richard Dacres assumed command until he was made post-captain in Bacchante on 14 January 1806. His replacement was his cousin, Commander William Furlong Wise.

On 5 May Elk captured a Spanish privateer rowboat armed with a swivel gun and small arms. The privateer was five days out of Santiago and had taken two doggers. Elk caught up with the privateer off Cape Cruz, Cuba, captured her and retook one of the doggers. The privateer was the Cubana, with a 14 man crew, only five of whom were still aboard.

Wise was promoted to post-captain and appointed to Mediator on 14 May. His replacement was Commander John Langdale Smith.

In August 1806 Commander George Morris took command, replacing Smith, who had taken command of Penguin in May or June. On 1 October Elk destroyed the five-gun privateer Alliance. Elephant had sent Elk to investigate a schooner. After chasing his quarry for nine hours, Morris eventually caught up with her. Elk's masts had received damage in the chase and fearing that he might lose the prize if the winds changed, Morris rammed her. Her commander was M. Alexander St. Helme and she was armed with one long 12-pounder gun, two sixes and two 12-pounder carronades, and carried a crew of 75 men. In her five days out of Guadeloupe, she had taken three prizes, two American schooners and the British brig Neptune, which had been on a voyage from Jamaica to Exuma. In capturing Alliance, Elk had so damaged her that she sank shortly after Morris took her crew aboard Elk.

At about this time Elk detained the Johanna Adriona, a neutral ship, which she sent in to the Vice admiralty court in Jamaica and which condemned her. The vessel's owners appealed to the Lords of Appeal, which reversed the seizure and awarded them expenses, which were deducted from the prize money due for the capture of Alliance.

In November Elk captured the Spanish privateer Coccila, of four guns and 20 men.

Commander William Summer Hall succeeded Morris, and was himself succeeded in July 1807 by Commander Jeremiah Coghlan. Coghlan commanded Elk for nearly four years and during this time was also senior officer of a light squadron that protected the Bahamas. On 25 July, Elk, under Coghlan's command, captured Fox. (Note: Prize money was paid in May 1821. Coghlan's first-class share was worth £83 9s 2d; a fifth-class share, that of a seaman, was worth 16s 0¼d.)

On 12 February 1808 Elk captured the French schooner privateer Harlequin, under the command of Petre Andia. She was armed with two carriage guns and small arms and carried a crew of 54 men. She was in the Caicos Passage having left Baracoa 10 days earlier. Harlequin had captured an American ship (under Swedish colours) sailing from Cape François, St. Domingo, (present day Cap-Haïtien) to Philadelphia with a cargo of coffee and sugar.

On 7 November Coghlan captured the one-gun Spanish letter of marque schooner Posta de Caracas. She was sailing from Campeche in Yucatan, Mexico, to Havana with a cargo of leather and rope and twenty-four thousand dollars in specie. During the chase she threw overboard the mails she was carrying and her gun.

In August, Elk captured the French naval schooner Superieuse and brought her into New Providence.

Coghlan's promotion to post-captain was dated 27 November 1810 but he remained in Elk for more than five months thereafter. On his departure he received letters of approbation from officials in the Bahamas, including the governor.

Coghlan's replacement in January 1811 was Captain Clement Milward, and it was he who sailed her back to Britain later that year. Elk arrived home on 27 September. She was in company with Sparrow as the two vessels had escorted a convoy of merchantmen from Negril. On the voyage the two warships recaptured the Ocean, a large ship carrying colonial produce, on 5 August.

== Fate ==
Elk was broken up at Chatham in October 1812.
