= Hired armed ship Sir Thomas Troubridge =

British Royal Navy ship

The hired armed ship Sir Thomas Troubridge or Thomas Troubridge, or Troubridge, or Trowbridge) was a ship that the Royal Navy put her under contract from 7 July 1804 to 9 May 1806. She was of 473 74/94 tons burthen (bm), and carried eighteen 6-pounder guns and eight 18-pounder carronades. She had a brief, astonishingly unremarkable career while under contract to the Navy.

Troubridge was one of four vessels that Mr. T. Lockyer, of Plymouth, owned that the government hired at the same time. In reporting the transaction, the Naval Chronicle described Trowbridge as armed with twenty 6-pounder guns and eight 18-pounder carronades. (Note: The other three vessels were the ships Lady Warren, of thirty-two 32-pounder carronades, Captain Mackellar, and Pretty Lass, of sixteen 6-pounder guns plus four 42-pounder carronades, Captain Tippett, as well as the schooner Colpoys.)

Trowbridge's commander from September 1804 was Commander William Bevians. Marshall's biographical note makes no mention of Bevians's period of command of Troubridge.

From 7 October 1804 on, Troubridge was permanently stationed at Galway.

== Fate ==
Readily available records do not reveal what happened to Sir Thomas Troubridge after the Navy ended her contract.
