= HMS Squirrel (1785) =

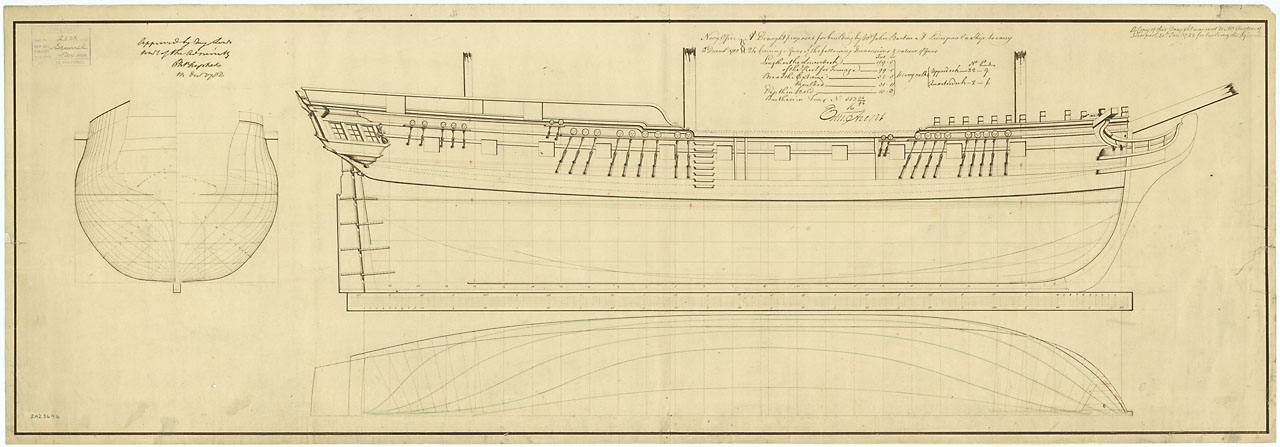
- Squirrel

History

Great Britain
- Name: HMS Squirrel
- Builder: Barton, Liverpool
- Launched: 9 May 1785
- Out of service: 6 March 1817
- Fate: Sold to J Cristall for breaking up

General characteristics
- Tons burthen: 563 (bm)
- Length: 119 ft (36.3 m)
- Beam: 32 ft 6 in (9.9 m)
- Armament: 24 guns

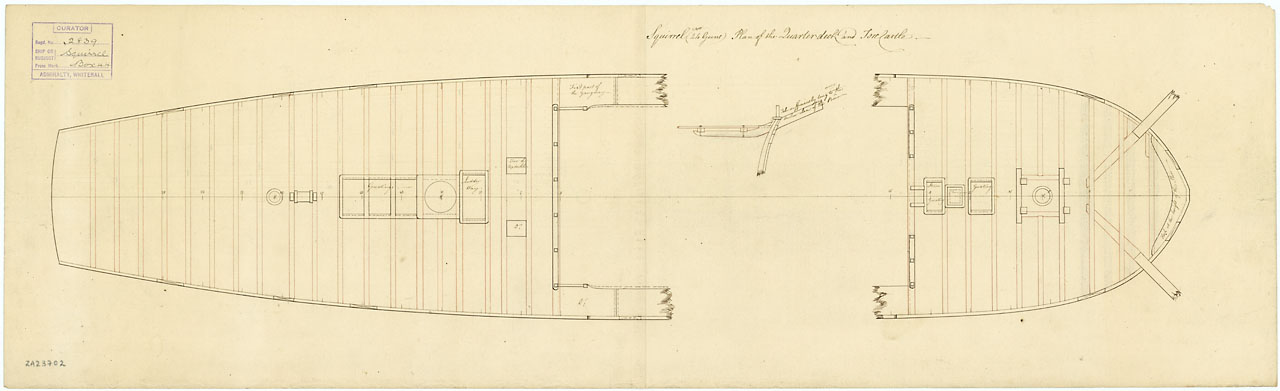
Broken view plan, showing the quarterdeck and forecastle

HMS Squirrel was a Royal Navy 24-gun sixth rate, built in 1785 and broken up in 1817.

In February 1799, while serving on the Jamaica Station, Squirrel and HMS Trent, captured the 14-gun privateer, Penada.

On 3 March 1806, Squirrel and Mediator left Cork, escorting a convoy for the West Indies. The convoy was reported "all well" on 25 March at 27°30′N 20°30′W. Squirrel was going to escort 12 merchantmen on to Demerara, Berbice, and Surinam. Squirrel, Lynx, and Driver captured three ships on 6 September: Snelle, Jager, and Engesende. Jalouse shared by agreement with Lynx and Driver in the proceeds.
