= HMS Hawk (1803) =

Sloop of the Royal Navy

History

France
- Name: Atalante
- Builder: Bordeaux
- Launched: 1802
- Commissioned: June 1803
- Captured: July 1803

United Kingdom
- Name: HMS Hawk
- Acquired: July 1803 by capture
- Fate: Disappeared, presumed foundered December 1804

General characteristics
- Type: Ship or sloop-of-war
- Displacement: 220 tonnes (French)
- Tons burthen: 32042/94 (bm),
- Length: Overall: 90 ft 11 in (27.7 m); Keel: 76 ft 11 1/2 in (23.5 m)
- Beam: 27 ft 11 3/4 in (8.5 m)
- Depth of hold: 8 ft 2 in (2.5 m)
- Sail plan: Brig
- Complement: French service: 128; British service: 121
- Armament: French service: 14 × 6-pounder guns; British service: 16 × 24-pounder carronades + 2 × 9-pounder chase guns

HMS Hawk was an 18-gun sloop-of-war, previously the French privateer Atalante, that HMS Plantagenet captured in 1803. The Royal Navy took Atalante into service as HMS Hawk; she foundered in 1804.

== Origins ==
Atalante was a merchantman active from 1802. She was commissioned as a privateer in June 1803 in Bordeaux. She was on her first cruise under the command of Arnaud Martin when she was captured.

== Capture ==
Plantagenet was cruising for "the protection of the Trade" when at noon on 27 July she joined Rosario which was chasing a French privateer. By 4pm Rosario was within gunshot of their quarry when Rosario lost her topmast due to the amount of sail she was carrying, and dropped astern. By 8pm Plantagenet caught up with the privateer, which struck. The French vessel was Atalante, of Bordeaux, which had been out six days without capturing anything. She was pierced for 22 guns, but had only fourteen 6-pounders on board when Plantagenet captured her, having thrown the other guns overboard during the chase. She had a crew of 120 men under the command of Captain Arnaud Martin. Captain Hammond of Plantagenet described Atalante as an "exceedingly handsome Vessel", and as sailing remarkably fast, having "run us nearly Ninety Miles in the Nine Hours."

Plantagenet took off 90 Frenchmen and put a prize crew of 20 Englishmen, under the command of Lieutenant Batt, on board Atalante. After the two vessels had separated, 68 Frenchmen, who had concealed themselves below decks, rose and attempted to retake their vessel. The British were able to subdue the Frenchmen, but not before one British sailor had been shot dead by one of his crewmates, who had mistaken the dead man for a Frenchman. The later report described Atalante as being armed with sixteen 6-pounder guns and 160 men. She had been out of Bordeaux five days but had captured nothing.

Atalante arrived in Plymouth on 3 August. Lloyd's List described her as being of 24 guns and having a crew of 150 men.

== Career and loss ==
The Admiralty took Atalante in as Hawk, there already being an Atalante in Royal Navy service. The Royal Navy commissioned her in December 1803 under C. Apthorpe.

At some point Commander James Tippett replaced Apthorpe. She served in the British blockade of the French coast and on 10 August 1804 was in company with Aigle when a gale separated them. Aigle went on to capture two French corvettes. Tippett may not yet have taken command of Hawk as he was still captain of the hired armed ship Pretty Lass on 6 August when she sailed from Plymouth to take dispatches to the fleet at Brest.

Hawk, under Tippet's command, and Boadicea were cruising in the English Channel when on 1 December Hawk set off in pursuit of a strange sail. She never reappeared. The Admiralty presumed that she had foundered and paid her off on 31 December 1804.

== See also ==
- List of people who disappeared mysteriously at sea
