= HMS Alban (1806) =

UK, Danish, and UK naval schooner (1806–1812

History

United Kingdom
- Name: HMS Alban
- Owner: Royal Navy
- Ordered: 2 April 1804
- Launched: 1806
- Captured: 12 September 1810

Denmark
- Name: Alban
- Owner: Royal Danish Navy
- Acquired: 12 September 1810
- Captured: 11 May 1811

United Kingdom
- Name: HMS Alban
- Owner: Royal Navy
- Acquired: 11 May 1811
- Commissioned: October 1811
- Fate: Wrecked, 18 December 1812

General characteristics
- Class & type: Adonis-class schooner
- Tons burthen: 11075/94 (bm)
- Length: Overall: 68 ft 2 in (20.8 m); Keel: 50 ft 4 5/8 in (15.4 m)
- Beam: 20 ft 4 in (6.2 m)
- Depth of hold: 10 ft 3 in (3.1 m)
- Complement: 35
- Armament: 10 × 18-pounder carronades

HMS Alban was one of twelve Adonis-class schooners of the Royal Navy and was launched in 1806. She served during the Napoleonic Wars. During the Gunboat War she took part in two engagements with Danish gunboats, during the second of which the Danes captured her. The British recaptured her seven months later, but she was wrecked in 1812.

== Design ==
Like the rest of her class, Alban was made of Bermudan or pencil cedar and to a design copied from that of the Lady Hammond, a Bermudan sloop. The Admiralty ordered the class as cutters, but they were completed as schooners. Even so, most references to Alban refer to her as a cutter. She had a crew of 35 men and carried an armament of ten 18-pounder carronades.

== Initial service ==
She was commissioned in May 1805 under Lieutenant James Stone. On 27 July 1807 she was under the command of Lieutenant Henry Wier and in company with Hazard, Conflict, Growler, and the hired armed brig Colpoys, when they captured nine French chasse marees. On 27 October she recaptured Favourite.

On 17 January 1808 Alban captured the American ship Active. Then on 8 April she sailed for Rio de Janeiro.

== Gunboat War ==
In 1809 Alban sailed to the Baltic. On 5 November she captured the Prussian sloop Gute Bothe.

On 23 May 1810 Alban was in company with Raleigh and the hired armed cutter Princess of Wales, when they encountered seven Danish gunboats off The Skaw. In the subsequent engagement one gunboat blew up and the British succeeded in damaging and dispersing the other six.

On 13 June 1810, Alban captured the Regina Doreatha. Almost two weeks later, on 13 June, she captured the Danish galliot Catharina Augusta. Weir was promoted to the command of Calypso on 28 June 1810, but he was still captain of Alban on 12 July when she captured another Danish galliot, the Caroline. At some point command transferred to Lieutenant Samuel Thomas.

On 12 September 1810, Alban was off Læsø island when she saw six Danish gunboats coming towards her from the direction of the Skaw. Wind conditions were calm so Alban had to resort to her sweeps to try to escape the Danes. She was unsuccessful and by early afternoon an engagement had commenced. After about three hours, a cannon shot took off the back of Thomas's skull. His second in command, Midshipman Alexander Hutchinson, continued the resistance for another hour, but then struck. Alban had lost two men killed (including Thomas), and had three wounded, out of a crew of some 25. She also had five feet of water in her hold, and her rigging and sails were entirely shot away. The subsequent court martial honourably acquitted Hutchinson and the surviving officers and men, and recommended Hutchinson for promotion. The Danish gunboat flotilla was under the command of Lieutenant Jørgen Conrad de Falsen.

== Danish service ==
The Alban was under the command of Lieutenant Thøger Emil Rosenørn when she encountered Rifleman on 11 May 1811 near the Shetland Islands. (Note: Rosenørn had been the captain of Salorman when the British captured her at Nyborg in 1808.) Rifleman chased The Alban for twelve hours before she succeeded in capturing the Dane. She was armed with 12 guns and had a crew of 58 men. (Note: Danish records report her official complement as 38 men. They also show her armament as consisting of ten 18-pounder carronades and two 12-pounder carronades.) She was three days out of Farsund, Norway, but had not captured anything.

According to Danish sources, Rosenørn fought bravely and when he saw that defeat was inevitable, he hacked away rigging and created holes in the hull before he surrendered. (Note: Translation from the Danish website:) Even so, The Alban did not sink and the British took her back into service as Alban.

== British service and loss ==
The Admiralty had Alban fitted at Sheerness between July and November 1811. She was recommissioned in October under Lieutenant William Sturges Key.

Alban was wrecked on 18 December 1812 at Aldeburgh, Suffolk. A contemporary newspaper report suggested she had run against an offshore sandbank on the evening of 17 December, and become stuck fast. The crew immediately lightened the ship by throwing the guns overboard and cutting away the mast. This freed the vessel but left her drifting helplessly towards the Aldeburgh shore, where she was beached at 8am on the following morning.

Townsfolk from Aldeburgh reached the ship by mid-morning to discover the ship firmly beached with the stern still partly submerged in the surf. The crew were alive, other than ship's surgeon, Mr Thompson, who jumped overboard when the rescue party arrived and was drowned in the waves by the stern. It appeared that the vast majority of those on board were drunk and made no effort to escape the vessel despite ready access to the shore. By 9am the tide had risen through the ship and drowned all but two on board. The survivors, a seaman and a female servant of Lieutenant Key's wife, were brought away in safety.
