= William Furlong Wise =

Rear-Admiral William Furlong Wise CB
- Born: 21 August 1784; Woolston near Kingsbridge, Devon, England
- Died: 29 April 1844 (aged 59); Hoegate House, Plymouth, Devon, England
- Relatives: George Furlong Wise (father); Vice Admiral James Dacres (uncle); Vice Admiral Richard Dacres (uncle)
- Military career
- Allegiance: United Kingdom
- Branch: Royal Navy
- Service years: 1797–1821
- Rank: Rear-Admiral
- Commands: HMS Drake; HMS Elk; HMS Mediator; HMS Granicus; HMS Spartan
- Conflicts: French Revolutionary Wars; Napoleonic Wars; Second Barbary War
- Awards: Companion of the Most Honourable Military Order of the Bath

Rear-Admiral William Furlong Wise, CB (21 August 1784 – 29 April 1844) was a British naval officer.

== Childhood ==
Wise was born at the family home in Woolston near Kingsbridge, Devon, the son of George Furlong Wise of Woolston and his wife, Jane (née Dacres). His mother was the sister of Vice-Admiral James Richard Dacres (1749–1810) and also of Vice-Admiral Sir Richard Dacres (1761–1837), two connections which would serve him well in his future naval career. Indeed, the name James Richard Dacres appears several times in Wise's lifetime because his uncle James Richard Dacres had a son, also called James Richard Dacres (1788–1853) who served alongside Wise at various times.

== Early career ==
Wise entered the navy on 7 February 1797 on the frigate Astraea under his uncle Richard Dacres, and served, for the most part, with him on the home station, the coast of France, and in the West Indies.

On 1 May 1804 he was promoted to lieutenant of the Franchise at Jamaica. At that time his uncle Vice Admiral James Dacres was second in command on the Jamaica station, serving under Sir John Thomas Duckworth and flying his flag in the Franchise.

Wise was a lieutenant on Theseus when she was caught in a hurricane off the West Indies in September 1804. His fellow lieutenant on Theseus Edward Burt (later Captain) drew a set of four prints which are in the National Maritime Museum. Wise was to later commission Thomas Luny recreate two of them as oil paintings when they had both retired to Devon. Wise then spent a brief period on Hercule.

On 1 November 1805 (confirmed on 22 February 1806) he was promoted to commander of the Drake. On 14 January 1806 he was transferred to Elk, a sloop of war which was previously under the command of his cousin Commander James Richard Dacres

On 5 May Elk, under Wise's command, captured a Spanish privateer rowboat armed with a swivel gun and small arms. The privateer was five days out of Santiago and had taken two doggers. Elk caught up with the privateer off Cape Cruz, Cuba, captured her and retook one of the doggers. The privateer was the Cubana, with a 14-man crew, only five of whom were still aboard.

== HMS Mediator ==
On 18 May 1806 he was promoted to post-captain and appointed to the Mediator. On 16 February 1807 Wise in Mediator and James Richard Dacres in Bacchante led a raid on the fort at Samana. He was subsequently awarded a sword worth £100 from Lloyd's Patriotic Fund, which bears the inscription "From the Patriotic Fund at Lloyd's to William Furlong Wise Esq. Capt. of H.M.S. Mediator for his Gallant Conduct in Storming and Destroying with the Seamen and Marines belonging to His Majesty's Ships Bacchante and Mediator the Fort and Cannon in the Harbour of Samana on 16th of February 1807 as Recorded in the London Gazette of the 25th of April" In July 1807 Wise was invalided out of Mediator, and spent some time in the West Indies recuperating.

== Marriage ==
On 16 June 1810, he married Frances Grant Grenfell of England, the only daughter of William Grenfell. Fanny accompanied Wise on at least one voyage, as attested to by Captain Coggeshall of the Leo in his account of his capture and passage to Gibraltar as Wise's prisoner.

== HMS Granicus - Bombardment of Algiers ==
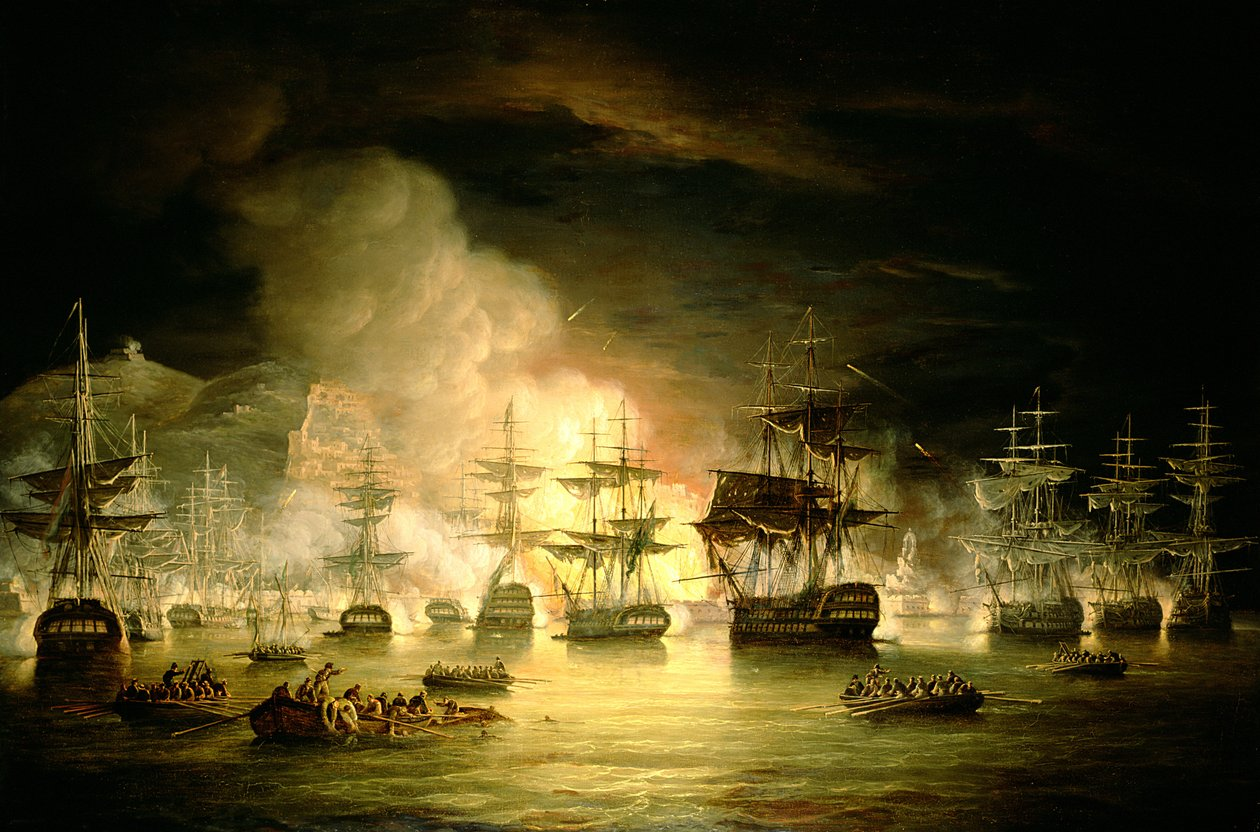
Bombardment of Algiers by Luny.

In November 1813 Wise commissioned the 36-gun frigate Granicus.

On 2 December 1814 he captured the Leo, an American privateer of 6 guns and 76 men, near Cape Spartel

On 27 August 1816 in Granicus he was with Admiral Lord Exmouth at the Bombardment of Algiers. He was cited for notable action.

A contemporary wrote of the action: "The Granicus and Hebrus frigates, and the smaller vessels (except the bombs) being considered in the light of a corps-de-reserve, had not had any particular stations assigned to them, but were to bring up abreast of any openings they could find in the line of battle. Impelled onward by the ardent desire of filling the first of these openings, the Hebrus got becalmed by the heavy cannonade, and was obliged to anchor a little without the line, on the Queen Charlotte's larboard quarter. The Granicus, finding herself shooting fast ahead, hove to, with the intention of waiting until her companions had taken their stations. As, owing to the dense smoke which prevailed, nothing beyond the distance of a cable's length could be seen, except the Queen Charlotte's mast-head flag, Captain Wise allowed 10 minutes to elapse for the ships to anchor. The Granicus then filled, let fall her fore-sail, set top-gallant-sails, and, soon gaining fresh way, steered straight for a beacon that, phoenix-like, seemed to live in the hottest of the fire. With a display of intrepidity and of seamanship alike unsurpassed, Captain Wise anchored his frigate in a space scarcely exceeding her own length between the Queen Charlotte and Superb; a station of which a three-decked line-of-battle ship might justly have been proud."

The Granicus, on this brilliant occasion, sustained a loss of 16 killed and 42 wounded; amongst the latter were Lieutenant Henry Augustus Perkins, and Messrs. Lewis Punbar Mitchell, Lewis Tobias Jones, George R. Glennie, and Dacres Furlong Wise, Midshipmen. The reference to Dacres Furlong Wise reminds us of the close links between Wise and Dacres family, he would likely have been the son of one of his uncles taken under Wise's wing as a midshipman on Granicus. On the second day after the battle, the following correspondence took place between Granicus' crew and the Superb's:

"The ship's company of the little frigate that had the honour to lay between the Queen Charlotte and Superb, on the glorious 27th of August, 1816, beg leave to express their high admiration of the noble fire kept up by these ships on that glorious day, by which, in a great measure, the enemy's fire was drawn from his Majesty's ship Granicus."

Superb replied.

"The ship's company of the Superb returns their many thanks to the ship's company of the little frigate, for the high compliment they have been pleased to pay them, and have only to hope that should they ever again go into action, they may have a Granicus to support them.

Like many naval captains Wise commissioned Thomas Luny to do a painting of the bombardment for him. The paintings are all essentially similar to the one Luny did for Lord Exmouth that now hangs in the National Maritime Museum at Greenwich, the main dereferences being each particular Captain's vessel is centre stage.

On 21 September 1816, in recognition of Wise's contribution to the action at Algiers he was made a Companion of the Most Honorable Military Order of the Bath (CB).

== HMS Spartan - return to Algiers ==
On 6 January 1818 Wise was appointed to the frigate Spartan, which he commanded on the home station and in the West Indies until 1821. The Spartan was despatched to Algiers where Wise entered into a negotiation with the Dey, the result of which was, the payment of 35,000 dollars as a compensation for the property plundered on board the Misericordia, and an unqualified disavowal, on the part of the reigning Dey, of the act of his predecessor (who died of the plague on 1 March 1818) in sending away the representative of his Sardinian Majesty.

In 1819, Spartan visited Madeira, Dominica, Vera Cruz, Jamaica, Barbados, and Halifax.

In July 1820, she conveyed Lord Combermere from Barbados to England; and we subsequently find her proceeding to the Havannah, Charlestown, and New York; from whence she returned to England, for the purpose of being paid off, in January 1821.

== Retirement & death ==
Spartan returned to England, for the purpose of being paid off, in January 1821, after which Wise retired to Plymouth.

Wise was an active member of Plymouth civic society, becoming Mayor of Plymouth in 1829.

In 1832 when Plymouth suffered an outbreak of cholera, Wise was presented with a silver salver by Benjamin Smith III of London and inscribed "To William Furlong Wise Esq. Captain RN.CB. In testimony of his generous and unremitting exertions, regardless of all personal hazard, in behalf of the necessitous and afflicted, during the prevalence of Malignant Cholera in Plymouth 1832, Presented and inscribed by his fellow townsmen."

On 23 November 1841 Wise was appointed Rear-Admiral.

Wise died on 29 April 1844 at his residence, Hoegate House, Plymouth, after a week's illness.
