= Pretty Lass (1803 ship) =

History

France
- Launched: 1796
- Fate: Sold c.1802

United Kingdom
- Name: Pretty Lass
- Owner: T. Lockyer
- Acquired: c.1803
- Fate: Sunk 17 July 1807

General characteristics
- Tons burthen: 2592/94 or 263, or 264, or 270, (bm)
- Sail plan: Ship rig
- Complement: 80 (1803)
- Armament: 1803:16 × 6-pounder guns + 4 × 42-pounder carronades; 1805:14 × 18-pounder carronades + 4 × 6-pounder guns, or; 1805:14 × 18-pounder carronades

Pretty Lass was a ship launched in 1796, in France that a Briton purchased c.1803. From late 1803, she sailed as a privateer under a letter of marque until the Royal Navy put her under contract from 9 June 1804 to 25 May 1805, as a hired armed ship. She had a brief, unremarkable career while under contract to the Navy. She then carried troops for the unsuccessful second British invasion of the River Plate. Pretty Lass was sunk in 1807, at the River Plate.

== Career ==
Pretty Lass first appears in the Register of Shipping in 1804. (She does not appear in Lloyd's Register. The Register shows that she was built in France in 1796, and that she had received new sides of pine in 1802. Her master and owner is given as T. Lockyer. She is not described as a prize, and so was probably a vessel that Lockyer purchased during the Peace of Amiens.

=== Letter of marque ===
On 22 October 1803, T. Lockyer, Esq., announced he was the sole owner of two of the "most beautiful letters of marque that will sent from any port in the United Imperial Kingdoms of England and Ireland." Both were coppered. One was Pretty Lass, under the command of Alexander Ferguson. The other was the Lady Charlotte. It was Lockyer's intent that the two would sail together. The extent of Pretty Lass's armament, the size of her crew, and the fact that she was to sail in company with Lady Charlotte are consistent with her being a privateer.

On 22 December, Lockyer stated that Pretty Lass was almost ready for sea. She was under the command of Alexander Ferguson. Ferguson received a letter of marque on 15 August 1803.

=== Hired armed ship ===
Pretty Lass was one of four vessels that Mr. T. Lockyer, of Plymouth, owned that the government hired at the same time. In reporting the transaction, the Naval Chronicle described Pretty Lass as a ship under the command of Captain Tippet. (Note: The other three vessels were the ships Lady Warren, of thirty-two 32-pounder carronades, Captain Mackellar, and the Trowbridge, of twenty 6-pounder guns and eight 18-pounder carronades, as well as the schooner Colpoys, Lieutenant Usher.) Tippet was Commander James Tippett. The Sporting Magazine reported on Tippett's appointment to command Pretty Lass, stating that "It is no wonder that a Pretty Lass should have a Tippet."

Tippett was still in command on 6 August when Pretty Lass sailed from Plymouth with dispatches for the fleet at Brest. He left Pretty Lass to take command of Hawk, and was lost when Hawk disappeared, presumed foundered, in December. Tippett's successor was Commander Thomas Smith (or Smyth). Under Smyth's command, Pretty Lass served on convoy duty in the Channel.

The last mention in Lloyd's List of a Pretty Lass, armed ship, is that she returned to Plymouth from a cruise on 22 May.

=== Subsequent career ===
The next mention in Lloyd's List of a Pretty Lass is that Pretty Lass, Cumming, master, sailed from Portsmouth on 4 October 1805, as part of a convoy for Gibraltar. She returned from Gibraltar on 21 December.

== Fate ==
On 29 August 1806, Pretty Lass sailed from Simon's Bay. She was one of several transports, under escort by HMS Lancaster, that were carrying troops for the British invasion of the River Plate. The last mention is that Pretty Lass (transport), Cummings, master, was sunk in the River Plate on 17 July 1807.
