= HMS Conflict (1805) =

Gunvessel of the Royal Navy

History

United Kingdom
- Name: HMS Conflict
- Ordered: 20 November 1805
- Builder: Robert Davy, Topsham
- Laid down: February 1805
- Launched: 10 May 1805
- Commissioned: July 1805
- Honours and awards: Naval General Service Medal clasp "Basque Roads 1809"
- Fate: Foundered circa November 1810

General characteristics
- Class & type: Confounder-class gunbrig
- Tons burthen: 18162/94 (bm)
- Length: Overall: 84 ft 0 in (25.6 m); Keel: 69 ft 9 1/2 in (21.3 m)
- Beam: 21 ft 1 3/4 in (6.4 m)
- Depth of hold: 11 ft 0 in (3.4 m)
- Complement: 50
- Armament: 10 × 18-pounder carronades + 2 × 12-pounder chase guns

HMS Conflict was launched in 1805. She captured a number of vessels, including privateers, and participated in several major actions. She disappeared in November 1810 with the loss of all her crew.

== Career ==
In 1805 Conflict underwent fitting out at Plymouth. Lieutenant Joseph P. Batt commissioned her in July for the Channel.

On 27 April 1806 Minerva and Conflict were off Finistere when a lugger privateer came around the Cape. Conflict set off after the lugger and after a chase of some 60 miles, captured her. The French privateer was Finisterre, of 14 guns and 50 men, under the command of Monsieur Michel Denré. (Note: Finistère was a privateer from Brest, commissioned in February 1806 with 42 men and 14 guns.)

HMS Hazard, Growler, Conflict, and hired armed brig Colpoys formed the blockading squadron off the Pertuis Breton, the strait between the north-east coast of the Île de Ré and the continent. On 27 July 1807 they sighted 16 enemy vessels in the entrance sailing eastward. Because it was nearly calm the British ships had no chance of closing with the French vessels so Capt. Dilkes of Hazard sent the boats in chase. The British came under intense small-arms fire from the shore that caused no casualties. The boats were able to capture nine chasse-marées, two of them armed. Alban was also among the captors.

The captured vessels were: Deux Amis (armed with two 4-pounder guns), Trois Freres (armed with four swivel guns, Veronique (laden with wheat), Sans Pareil (laden with wheat), Marie Francoise (in ballast), Mairie Louise (in ballast), Bon Janton (in ballast), Pascal (in ballast), and Gaulle (in ballast). Their crews escaped on shore with all their papers. The crew of a tenth chasse-maree scuttled their vessel to prevent the British from capturing her. The British drove six on to the shore, one of which was armed with six guns. The schooner Alban shared in the prize money for the action. The lugger Trois Amis and the chasse maree Courier de Nantes, each of about 20 tons (bm), and their cargoes, were auctioned on 20 April 1807 at Plymouth.

On 3 May 1808 HMS Amethyst and Conflict captured the French sloop Actif. Sixteen days later, Amethyst, Conflict, and Growler were in company when they captured the French schooner Annais. The next month, on 10 June, Amethyst and Conflict captured the Spanish schooner Carmelita. (Note: The share of a petty officer was 7s 2¼d, and the share of a seaman was 1s 5½d.)

Then on 31 July, Conflict was in company with Indefatigable, when Indefatigable captured the letter of marque Diane, which was on her way to Île de France, carrying naval stores, as well as letters and dispatches that she threw overboard during the chase. She was six years old, had a burthen of 482 tons (bm), was armed with fourteen 9 and 6-pounder guns, and had a crew of 68 men. She had left the Gironde the evening before on this, her second voyage, to India.

On 19 August Indefatigable, still in company with Conflict, captured Adele. In December a distribution of £10,000 was payable for the proceeds from Diane and Adele.

In 1809 Conflict, with five other gunbrigs, joined the fleet assembling for the attack on the French fleet in the Basque Roads. On 11 April Conflict took part in the attack on the French fleet in Basque Roads.

In the evening the brigs HMS Beagle, Conflict, Doterel, and Growler, and the 36-gun frigate Emeraldd were stationed at the eastern end of the Isle d'Aix to create a diversion while fireships and explosion vessels were launched against the enemy.

During the morning of April Conflict joined other gun-brigs in firing on three grounded French ships in the River Charente but the falling tide in the afternoon forced them to retreat under fire from shore batteries. (Note: Head money for Basque Roads was paid in March 1819. An ordinary seaman received 13 shillings; a first-class share was worth £86 13s 2¼d.) In 1847 the Admiralty authorized the issuance of the NGSM with clasp "Basque Roads 1809" to all surviving British participants in the battle.

On 19 June 1809 Insolent, Arrow, and Conflict were in company when they captured the French brig Amitaire.

Conflict was in company with Christian VII, Armide, and Snapper when they captured the chasse maree Felicitée on 10 January 1810 and Glorieuse ten days later.

On 25 January the French privateer Phoenix, of 20 guns and 110 men, belonging to Bordeaux, captured Donna Maria, Lunes, master, which had been sailing from Boston to Lisbon. However, on 9 February Conflict recaptured Donna Maria on 9 February; she arrived at Plymouth on 24 February.

== Fate ==
Conflict sailed from Corunna bound to Vivero Bay when she disappeared. She was believed to have foundered with the loss of all her crew on or about 9 November 1810.
