= Colpoys (1803 ship) =

Former French vessel

History

France
- Launched: 1803
- Fate: Sold 1803.

United Kingdom
- Name: Colpoys
- Namesake: Admiral Sir John Colpoys
- Owner: Thomas Lockyer, Plymouth
- Acquired: 1803
- Fate: No longer listed after 1811

General characteristics
- Tons burthen: 15820/94 or 160 (bm)
- Sail plan: Schooner, later brig, returned to schooner
- Complement: 40
- Armament: 1804:14 × 12-pounder carronades + 2 × 4-pounder guns; 1805:14 × 18-pounder guns "of the New Construction"

The hired armed brig Colpoys was a former French vessel, launched in 1803, that was acquired by a Plymouth owner in the same year. After some months as a privateer schooner in the West Indies, she was chartered to the Royal Navy as a hired armed vessel from April 1804 until 1807. Colpoys was apparently converted to a brig in early 1805. She participated in the blockade of Brest and captured numerous small vessels. Colpoys's contract ended in 1807, and her fate is unknown.

== The vessel ==
Colpoys was a 160-ton (bm) schooner, French-built in 1803, and acquired that year by Thomas Lockyer of Plymouth, where her hull was coppered and surveyed in June 1804. She first appears in the Register of Shipping in 1805 as on government service, with W Neale as master, and with the highest classification - A1 - which, as a French-built ship, was valid for ten years. The register entry remained unaltered until 1811, after which it disappears, without explanation.

== Naval service ==
Colpoys was one of four vessels that Lockyer hired to the government at the same time, on 28 April 1804. In reporting the transaction, the Naval Chronicle described Colpoys as a schooner under the command of Lieutenant Ussher (or Usher), and the two chase guns as 6-pounders. (Note: The other three vessels were the ships Lady Warren, Captain Mackellar, of thirty-two 18-pounder carronades, Pretty Lass, Captain Tippett, of fourteen 18-pounder carronades and four 6-pounder guns, and Trowbridge, of twenty 6-pounder guns and eight 18-pounder carronades.) Throughout Colpoys's military career, references to her in the London Gazette and Lloyd's List variously described her as a brig, cutter, and schooner. There are no references in Admiralty records of other vessels by that name, and the names of her commander generally assure that all these vessels are one and the same. The hire ended on 22 August 1807.

In a letter dated 11 February 1805, Ussher refers to his vessel as "Colpoys, hired schooner". Then in a letter dated September 1805, Ussher refers to his vessel as "Colpoys hired brig". That would suggest that her rig was modified from schooner to brig between those dates. In a letter dated Torbay, 19 March 1805, Vice-Admiral Sir Charles Cotton reported that he had taken command of a number of vessels there that Admiral William Cornwallis had left behind. One of these was the "brig Colpoys". That would suggest that the conversion from schooner to brig had occurred in February–March 1805.

In his biography of Thomas Ussher, Marshall describes Colpoys as having a crew of 40 men. (Note: James gives her complement as a more standard 121 men. Although more congruent with the size of her armament, it is too large a complement for a lieutenant's command.)

=== First commander: Thomas Ussher ===
==== 1804 ====
Lieutenant Thomas Ussher (or Usher) was appointed to command Colpoys on 6 April 1804. She then was attached to Admiral Cornwallis's blockading force off Brest. On 7 May, she was at Plymouth when sealed dispatches arrived and she immediately set out to westward, destination unknown but presumed to be for the Streights [sic]. On 30 June, a Spanish brig, the Nombra del Jesus, and her cargo of soap, brandy, and the like, arrived at Plymouth. She had been sailing to Morlaix when Colpoys captured her and sent her in.

Towards the end of 1804, Ussher was assigned to be the second-in-command to Captain Peter Puget in a proposed operation to destroy the fleet at Brest by means of fire ships. (Note: Puget, in a letter to Cornwallis referred to "Lieutenant Ussher, of the Sir John Colpoys schooner".) However a succession of winter gales blew the British fleet from the coast. When the fleet regained its station Cornwallis was unsure as to whether or not the enemy had left port. Ussher, of his own accord, that night sailed close to shore and then took his gig (a 4-oared boat) into the harbour. He rowed along the whole French line, which consisted of 21 ships. The French spotted the gig as it was alongside the flagship, but though several enemy boats pursued him, Ussher escaped. The next day Colpoys joined the British squadron flying the signal "The enemy the same as when last reconnoitered".

Ussher's next exploit was to land at midnight on 6 September, with only six men not more than 200 yards from Fort de Bertheaume. There he captured a signal-post with its copy of the French private signals. Lloyd's Patriotic Fund gave Mr. Francis Rennells, Colpoys's mate, an honour sword worth £30 for "his spirited conduct" in the attack.

==== 1805 ====
On 8 January 1805, the "armed ship" Colpoys brought a Spanish prize into Portsmouth. Then on 17 February, there arrived at Plymouth Jong Jerrens (or Jong Jarrett) Bart, master, which had been sailing from Marens or (or Marennes) to Bilbao when Colpoys detained her.

Next, on 5 February, Colpoys was off Cape Machicacho, some 60 kilometres (37 mi; 32 nmi) west of San Sebastián when Ussher sighted a chasse-marée going along the shore. Ussher set out in his boat and drove her ashore beneath the guns of a shore battery. He landed, spiked four of the guns, and threw a fifth over the parapet of the battery. The chasse-marée had bilged; she had been carrying brandy. In his letter to Cornwallis, Ussher also reported that Colpoys had detained three neutral vessels on their way to Spain. These were:

- Swedish vessel Catherina Christina, detained on 28 January, as she was carrying earthenware from Hull to Santander:
- Prussian galiot Catherina Dorothea, detained on 3 February, while carrying wheat from Marens to Santander; and,
- Prussian galiot Jonge Guiet Bart, detained on 6 February, while also carrying wheat from Marens to Santander.

On 17 February, there arrived at Plymouth Jong Jerrens (or Jong Jarrett Bart, which Lloyd's List reported had been sailing from Marens or (or Marennes) to Bilbao when Colpoys detained her.

Fortuitously, the next day Cornwallis wrote to Mr. William Marsden, Secretary to the Admiralty, explaining that although there had been long-standing orders that neutral vessels trading with Spain were not to be detained, that after hostilities with Spain were announced, British captains had "generally understood that those orders were not in force", and giving Ussher's letter as an example. Cornwallis explained that he had just received a letter from the Lords Commissioners of the Admiralty, dated 4 February, stating that the orders were still in force, and that he would so advise the flag officers, captains, and commanders under his orders.

In March 1805, Colpoys was at Torbay and by 3 April, she was at Ushant where Admiral Gardner took command of a fleet consisting of 17 ships of the line, plus one brig, Colpoys. She then carried dispatches between Ushant and Ferrol and back, returning to Ushant on 27 May. In July she again carried dispatches to Ferrol.

On 15 August, "His Majesty's Hired Armed Brig Colpoys" captured the American ship Olive Branch. She had been sailing from Nantes to St. Lucar, and Admiral Colpoys sent her into Plymouth. (Note: Probably a name error rather a reference to ship Admiral Colpoys.) (Note: The "proportion of a Petty Officer and Seaman" of the prize money was worth £10 4s 6d.)

About three weeks later, Colpoys captured two sloops, Federation, and another of unknown name. In a letter to Cornwallis, Ussher reported that he had captured Anna Maria on 5 September, four miles west of Arcarchon. The next day he captured Fédération some ten leagues NE of San Sebastián. He reported that there had been a third vessel, a Spanish brig, that had sailed with them but which he had not encountered. They were carrying 5000 sweeps and 400 grinding stones from San Sebastián to Brest for the account of the French government; the cargoes were intended for the French fleet at Boulogne.

On 17 September, the galiot Poppenburgh, Paradys, master, from the Charente, arrived at Plymouth, prize to Colpoys. While cruising in the Channel, Colpoys was badly damaged, including the loss of her figurehead, bowsprit and fore-topmast, when a schooner Felix ran foul of her; the brig arrived at Plymouth on 22 October, for repairs.

Towards the end of the year, on 28 December, "His Majesty's Hired Armed Cutter Colpoys" recaptured the Swedish ship Anna Maria Dorothea.

==== 1806 ====
In early January 1806, Colpoys detained Hercules, Weeks, master, which had been sailing from New York, and sent her into Plymouth.

On 18 February 1806, Colpoys recaptured Anna Margaretha Dorothea. Three days later Colpoys captured Prussian ship Mercurius. Mercurius, Hendiess, master, arrived at Plymouth on 22 February, together with Freija, Jordt, master, which had been sailing from Amsterdam to Leghorn when Colpoys detained her.

Five days after that, Colpoys captured the Prussian ship Evadne. This may have been Erandt, Gast, master, which had been sailing from Bordeaux to Embden and which arrived in Plymouth in early March. In mid-March the American ship Dragon, Beacon, master, which had been sailing from Lisbon to Corunna, arrived at Plymouth, a prize to Colpoys.

A week or so later, on 21 March, Colpoys captured three Spanish luggers under a battery of six 24-pounders in the port of Avilés. Two of the captured vessels, Santa Buena Ventura and San Antonio, were both armed with two guns and carried cargoes of flax and steel. The third vessel was San Real, which was in ballast. Ussher, with six men, was in the lead British boat. When he and his men arrived at the first of the three Spanish vessels their crews and some soldiers stationed on board them jumped off. Still, the British took 13 men prisoners. Apparently, he sent two men to the commander of the battery protecting the port to inform him that if the Spanish fired on British as they withdrew Ussher would hang his prisoners. Colpoys had two men wounded in the attack, one of them seriously. Ussher left his eleven remaining prisoners on San Real, which he left behind. The two luggers arrived at Penzance on 31 March, and San Antonio arrived at Plymouth in mid-April. Bon Aventura arrived there on 17 April. The Lloyd's Patriotic Fund awarded Ussher an honour sword valued at £50 for his feat.

An item appeared in the Naval Chronicle to the effect that during the February–March period, Colpoys had engaged a ship stronger than herself off Ferrol, almost under the batteries. Colpoys forced the enemy to run ashore, where the vessel bilged and sank; the crew were saved. Unfortunately, there does not seem to be any other, confirming source for this report.

On 19 April, 24 men from Colpoys and the gun-brig Attack, under Ussher's command, landed at the entrance of the river Donillan and spiked two guns of a battery in order to be able to proceed up the river in pursuit of two chasse-marées. They then caught up with their quarries, capturing Vincent Gabriel and Marie Française, which they were able to bring out. They also destroyed the signal station at Donillan. The British suffered no casualties in the operation. (Note: Ussher reported that he had been cruising along the coast between the Glénan Islands and the Isle Groer. Donillan appears to be Port Doelan, and James in his account identifies the island as Groix.)

Early in May, Colpoys sent in a French lugger with a cargo of slates.

Then on 30 June, Colpoys and the hired armed cutter Frisk captured the French chasse-marées No. 1 and No. 2. On 14 July, the two British vessels captured the Spanish chasse-marée No.3.

Soon afterwards, with the gun-brig Haughty and Frisk under his orders, Ussher volunteered to cut out a French frigate lying at San Sebastián. However, contrary winds delayed him and the frigate sailed.

With the same vessels, and the schooner Felix, he destroyed several batteries at St. Antonio, Avilés, and Bermeo, and on 28 July, he captured the town of Ea. However less than a week later he was obliged to resign command of Colpoys as his leg wound had broken out afresh.

In mid-July, Colpoys sent into Britain the Portuguese vessel Aurora, Morchado, master, which had been sailing from Nantes to Lisbon.

On Ussher's departure from Colpoys, her crew presented him with a sabre as token of their "respect and esteem." On 18 October, now Commander Ussher received command of the brig-sloop Redwing.

=== Second commander: David Buchan ===
Lieutenant David Buchan replaced Ussher. By 19 September, he was already in command of Colpoys and at sea, recapturing Eddystone. The French frigates Sirène and Revanche had captured the Eddystone, Sarman, master, on 13 September, as she was sailing from Quebec to London. The Frenchmen took out her captain, crew, and furs, which were the most valuable part of her cargo. Colpoys recaptured Eddystone off Cape Finisterre and sent her into Plymouth, where she arrived in early October.

On 27 December, Colpoys and Phoenix captured the small merchant ship El Cupido (or El Cupedo), alias La Buena Ventura, which had been sailing from Montevideo to San Sebastián. In the first week of January 1807, El Cupido was sent into Plymouth.

==== 1807 ====
On 12 February 1807, Colpoys captured the French brig Prudente. This may have been Providence, a French brig carrying pitch and tar, reported as arriving in Plymouth in mid-March, a prize to Colpoys.

Hazard, Growler, Conflict, and Colpoys formed the blockading squadron off the Pertuis Breton, the strait between the north-east coast of the Île de Ré and the continent. Between 1 April and 10 June the small squadron captured and destroyed two sloops, Rosalie and Jeune Marie, and five chasse-marées: Petit Marie, Patriot, Marianne, Belle Louise Josephine, and Marie Françoise. Colpoys escorted the prizes back to Plymouth, the French shore batteries sank one chasse-marée, of unknown name, after the British had captured her.

On 27 July, they sighted 16 enemy vessels in the entrance sailing eastward. Because it was nearly calm the British ships had no chance of closing with the French vessels so Capt. Dilkes of Hazard sent the boats in chase. The British came under intense small-arms fire from the shore that caused no casualties. The boats were able to capture nine chasse-marées, two of them armed.

The captured vessels were: Deux Amis (armed with two 4-pounder guns), Trois Frere Horaces (armed with four swivel guns, Veronique (laden with wheat), Sans Pareil (laden with wheat), Marie Francoise (in ballast), Mairie Louise (in ballast), Bon Janton (in ballast), Pascal (in ballast), and Gaulle (in ballast). Their crews escaped on shore with all their papers. The crew of a tenth chasse-maree scuttled their vessel to prevent the British from capturing her. The British drove six on to the shore, one of which was armed with six guns. The schooner Alban shared in the prize money for the action. The lugger Trois Amis and the chasse maree Courier de Nantes, each of about 20 tons (bm), and their cargoes, were auctioned on 20 April 1807 at Plymouth.

== Post-naval career ==
Colpoys' hire to the Royal Navy ended on 22 August 1807, her subsequent activities and fate are not known.
