= Serpente-class corvette =

Class overview
- Name: Serpente
- Operators: French Navy; Royal Navy
- In commission: 1796–1816
- Completed: 4
- Lost: 1
- Retired: 3

General characteristics
- Type: Corvette
- Displacement: 727 ton (French)
- Tons burthen: 350 (bm) (Note: This is based on the descriptions of the member of the class that the Royal Navy captured, as described in Winfield.)
- Length: 40.28 m (132 ft 2 in) (overall)
- Beam: 9.745 m (31 ft 11.7 in)
- Draught: 3.84 m (12 ft 7 in)
- Propulsion: Sail
- Complement: 188
- Armament: 20 × 18-pounder long guns
- Armour: Timber

The Serpente class was a class of four 20-gun corvettes for the French Navy, designed by Charles-Henri Tellier as a follow-on to the Etna-class corvettes of the previous year. Four separate commercial shipbuilders were involved in their construction by contract, with three being ordered at Honfleur in 1794 and a fourth at Le Havre across the Seine estuary in 1795. The vessels were flush-decked and designed to carry a battery of twenty 18-pounder guns.

The Royal Navy captured one of the four vessels in the class, and burnt another in action.

== Serpente class (4 ships) ==
- Serpente

Builder: Jean-Louis Pestel, Honfleur
Begun: October 1794
Launched: 1 September 1795
Completed: January 1796
Fate: Floating battery 1806, hulked 1807. Condemned to be broken up 1815.

- Géographe

Builder: Louis Deros, later Nicolas Loquet, Honfleur
Begun: September 1794
Launched: 8 June 1800
Completed: September 1800
Fate: Employed as survey ship for Australian expedition in 1800. Powder hulk 1807, later barracks ship. Deleted 1819.
Notes: Renamed from Uranie in 1797, then from Galatée in June 1800. Loquet took over her building after Deros's early death, but then refused to launch her until he was paid.

- Bacchante

Builder: Fortier Brothers, Honfleur
Begun: October 1794
Launched: 29 December 1795
Completed: January 1796
Fate: Broken up in Rochefort August/September 1830
Notes: Captured on 25 June 1803 off the Azores by HMS Endymion, and became HMS Bacchante, sold 1809.

- Confiante

Builder: Foouache & Reine, Le Havre
Begun: September 1795
Launched: 10 May 1797
Completed: February 1798
Fate: Destroyed on 29 May 1798 in the mouth of the Dives (river) by HMS Hydra.
