= French corvette Vénus (1794) =

French corvette launched in 1794

Vénus
History

France
- Name: Vengeance
- Builder: Bordeaux
- Laid down: 1793
- Launched: January 1794
- In service: April 1794
- Renamed: Vénus (1795)
- Captured: 22 October 1800

Great Britain
- Name: HMS Scout
- Acquired: 22 October 1800 by capture
- Fate: Wrecked 25 March 1801

General characteristics
- Displacement: 550 tons (French)
- Tons burthen: 40553/94 (bm)
- Length: 111 ft 0 in (33.8 m) (overall; 89 ft 10 5/8 in (27.4 m) (keel)
- Beam: 29 ft 1 1/2 in (8.9 m)
- Draught: 4.55 m (14.9 ft) (laden)
- Depth of hold: 13 ft 4 in (4.1 m)
- Sail plan: Full-rigged ship
- Complement: French service: 185 men; 200 when captured; British service: 185 men
- Armament: French service: 28 guns originally; 32 when captured; British service: Upper deck: 18 × 24-pounder carronades; Fc:2 × 6-pounder chase guns

Vénus was a corvette of the French Navy that the British captured in 1800. (Note: French sources refer to her as a corvette of 28-guns, however in British service she was classified as a sloop.) Renamed HMS Scout, she served briefly in the Channel before being wrecked in 1801, a few days after taking a major prize.

== French service ==
Vénus was begun in Bordeaux in 1793 as a privateer but the French Navy bought her while she was still on the stocks. She was launched in January 1794 as Vengeance and completed for service in the following April. The French commissioned her as a corvette and initially armed her with 26 guns: twenty-two 8-pounders on her upper deck and four 4-pounders on her galliards, i.e. her quarterdeck and forecastle.

Between 24 March 1794 and 14 September she was under the command of lieutenant de vaisseau Pimare. While under his command she sailed from Bordeaux to Brest and Dunkirk.

Vengeance was renamed Vénus in May 1795. She was at Brest in 1795 under the command of lieutenant de vaisseau Desagenaux. At some point she carried dispatches to Saint-Domingue.

By 1796 she had had 4 obusiers added on her gaillards. Desagneaux, promoted to capitaine de frégate commanded Vénus from 28 April 1796 to 14 June. lieutenants de vaisseau Pinsan and Landolphe succeeded him. During this time she sailed back from Saint-Domingue to Bordeaux, and then on to Rochefort. She carried troops and funds to Cayenne and Guadeloupe.

Vénus took part in the Expédition d'Irlande in 1796.

By July 1798 the obusiers had been removed and she carried ten 4-pounder guns on her galliards.

Under the command of capitaine de frégate Louis-André Senez, Vénus was in Commodore Savary's squadron at the Battle of Tory Island. She sailed from La Rochelle to Killala Bay, and then by 7 November had returned to Île-d'Aix Roads.

From 21 May 1800 Vénus was under the command of capitaine de frégate Bourrand. At some point she left Rochefort on a mission to Sénégal. She was off the Iberian Peninsula when the Royal Navy captured her.

== Capture ==
On 22 October 1800 Indefatigable captured Vénus off the Portuguese coast. Indefatigable had been chasing Venus from the morning when in the afternoon Fisgard came in sight and forced Vénus to turn. Both British vessels arrived at Vénus at about 7pm. Vénus was armed with 32 guns and had a crew of 200 men. She was sailing from Rochefort to Senegal. Later, Indefatigable and Fisgard shared the prize money with Boadicea, Diamond, Urania, and the hired armed schooner Earl St Vincent.

== Fitting for British service ==
Vénus was too small and too weak for the Royal Navy (RN) to take her in as a sixth-rate frigate or even a post-ship. She was designed for short-range privateering in the Channel and the Bay of Biscay, rather than the longer-range escort or patrol work of a British sloop. Accordingly, she couldn't stow as much in the way of stores as the Admiralty needed; reducing her armament, relative to her French establishment, would have permitted her to carry the larger weight of stores she had to carry in RN service.

== HMS Scout ==
The Royal Navy commissioned Vénus as Scout in November 1800 under Commander George Ormsby. She was fitted out at Plymouth until March 1801. However Ormsby died in January 1801. Ormsby's successor was Commander Henry Duncan.

In March 1801, Scout was in company with the hired armed vessels Sheerness and the Lady Charlotte when they captured a large Dutch East Indiaman off St Alban's Head. She was the Crown Prince, of 1,400 tons and 28 guns, and had been sailing from China to Copenhagen with a cargo of tea.

== Fate ==
Scout was wrecked on the Shingles, Isle of Wight, on 25 March 1801. The crew attempted to lighten her but all efforts had failed by late afternoon on 27 March. Due to the efforts of Beaver and the master attendant of the dockyard all the crew were saved.

On 1 April a court martial was held at Portsmouth on Gladiator for Commander Duncan, his officers, and crew for the loss of Scout. The court acquitted Duncan, the pilot, the officers, and the crew of all blame, ruling that the sinking was due to a strong tide catching Scout when she was vulnerable.

== Postscript ==
Duncan received command of Premier Consul, which Dryad had captured on 5 March 1801, and which the Admiralty renamed Scout. Scout foundered with the loss of all hands in 1801 or 1802. Naval opinion was that she went down off Newfoundland.

== See also ==
- List of ships captured in the 19th century
