= HMS Growler (1804) =

Brig of the Royal Navy

History

United Kingdom
- Name: HMS Growler
- Ordered: 9 January 1804
- Builder: Balthazar & Edward Adams, Buckler's Hard
- Laid down: April 1804
- Launched: 10 August 1804
- Honours and awards: NGSM with clasps; "Basque Roads 1809"; "Growler 22 May 1812"

General characteristics
- Class & type: Archer-class gun-brig
- Tons burthen: 17858/94 (bm)
- Length: Overall: 80 ft 0 1/2 in (24.397 m); Keel: 65 ft 10 1/8 in (20.069 m)
- Beam: 22 ft 7 in (6.88 m)
- Depth of hold: 9 ft 5 in (2.87 m)
- Sail plan: Brig
- Complement: 50
- Armament: 10 × 18-pounder carronades + 2 chase guns

HMS Growler was an Archer-class gun-brig built for the British Royal Navy and launched in 1804. She captured several French privateers and one Danish privateer, and took part in two actions that earned her crew the Naval General Service Medal (NGSM). She was sold in 1815.

== Career ==
Lieutenant James Rose commissioned Growler in August 1804.

On 15 February 1805 Growler took in to Falmouth the French gunbrig No.193 that Growler had captured after an engagement of an hour-and-a-half. Transport No.193 was one of a squadron of brand new vessels bound for Brest from Bayonne and was armed with two long 24-pounder guns, one 18-pounder, and four swivel guns. She was one of four gunbrigs of the same class on their way from Bayonne to Brest when captured. She had a crew of 15 seamen under the command of an enseigne de vaisseau, and 34 soldiers under the command of an Army captain.

On 25 March Growler was off the Penmarks when she observed 15 French gunboats sailing along the shore. Growler was able to capture the two farthest from the shore. These were the transport pinnaces No.443, with 15 men aboard, and No.450, with 13 men on board. The remaining 13 gunboats took shelter under the Penmarks, which prevented Rose from capturing more. (Note: For a description of the Péniches (Bâtiments de 3ème Espèce) see Winfield and Roberts (2015).)

On 19 May Growler captured the chasse maree Maria Victoire.

On 12 November Growler brought Goede Verwagting into Dartmouth. She had been sailing from Rotterdam when Growler detained her.

On 28 January 1806 Growler, under the command of Lieutenant Thomas Nesbitt, was in company with Attack off Brest. They sighted two luggers and Growler captured one. The prize was the French privateer lugger Voltiguer, of six 9-pounder guns (though pierced for 14 guns), and 66 men. She was one day out of Saint-Malo and had not captured anything. (Note: Voltigeur was a privateer lugger from Saint-Malo built in Dinant in 1805 and commissioned in January 1806. She was under the command of Alexandre Le Grand with 64 men and six guns.)

From her the British learned that the other lugger was also a French privateer and Attack set out in pursuit. After a nine-hour, circular chase Attack succeeded in capturing Sorcier, of 14 guns and 60 men under the command of Guillaume Francoise Neele. (Note: Sorcier was a privateer lugger from Saint-Malo, built there in 1805 and commissioned in December under a Captain Néel, with 60 men and four guns. Her capture occurred soon after she departed for her first cruise circa 28 January 1806.)

Sorciere and Voltigier arrived at Plymouth on 1 February.

On 19 April, 24 men from the hired armed brig Colpoys and Attack, landed at the entrance of the river Donillan and spiked two guns of a battery in order to be able to proceed up the river in pursuit of two chasse-marées. They then caught up with their quarries, capturing Vincent Gabriel and Marie Française, which they were able to bring out. They also destroyed the signal station at Donillan. The British suffered no casualties in the operation. Growler may have been in company; her assistant surgeon accompanied the landing party. (Note: Ussher reported that he had been cruising along the coast between the Glénan Islands and the Isle Groer. Donillan appears to be Port Doelan, and the island appears to be Groix.)

Also in April Growler detained Maria, of Pappenburg, Mansell, master, sailing from Bayonne. Then in May Growler detained Young Edward, Moise, master, from New York.

On 1 June 1806, Growler, Lieutenant Thomas Nesbitt, commanding, captured Aimable Babet. A chasse maree, laden with salt, prize to Growler, arrived at Plymouth.

By July 1806 Growler was operating with the Channel fleet and under the command of Lieutenant Samuel Thomas. Lieutenant Richard Crossman replaced Thomas.

Hazard, Growler, Conflict, and Colpoys formed the blockading squadron off the Pertuis Breton, the strait between the north-east coast of the Île de Ré and the continent. On 27 July 1807 they sighted 16 enemy vessels in the entrance sailing eastward. Because it was nearly calm the British ships had no chance of closing with the French vessels so Capt. Dilkes of Hazard sent the boats in chase. The British came under intense small-arms fire from the shore that caused no casualties. The boats were able to capture nine chasse-marées, two of them armed.

The captured vessels were: Deux Amis (armed with two 4-pounder guns), Trois Freres (armed with four swivel guns, Veronique (laden with wheat), Sans Pareil (laden with wheat), Marie Francoise (in ballast), Mairie Louise (in ballast), Bon Janton (in ballast), Pascal (in ballast), and Gaulle (in ballast). Their crews escaped on shore with all their papers. The crew of a tenth chasse-maree scuttled their vessel to prevent the British from capturing her. The British drove six on to the shore, one of which was armed with six guns. The schooner Alban shared in the prize money for the action. The lugger Trois Amis and the chasse maree Courier de Nantes, each of about 20 tons (bm), and their cargoes, were auctioned on 20 April 1807 at Plymouth.

In March 1808 Growler detained and sent into Plymouth Atlantic, Grover, master, which ha been sailing from Charente to Teneriffe.

On 19 May, HMS Amethyst, Conflict, and Growler were in company when they captured the French schooner Annais. Then Amethyst was again in company with Growler when they captured St. Etienne, Maria Julia, and six chasse marees on 9 July.

On 25 June Growler captured the American ship Tiger, Clark, master.

In 11 April 1809 Growler took part in the attack on the French fleet in Basque Roads. (Note: Head money was paid in March 1819. An ordinary seaman received 13 shillings; a first-class share was worth £86 13s 2¼d.) In 1847 the Admiralty authorized the issuance of the NGSM with clasp "Basque Roads 1809" to all surviving British participants in the battle.

In 1810 Lieutenant John Weeks took command of Growler.

In June 1811 Nuestra Senora del Carmen came into Plymouth. She had been sailing from Coruna to Bilbao when Growler detained her.

On 4 October 1811 Growler arrived at Plymouth with dispatches from Coruna. That night the wind increased to a hurricane; at 2a.m. Growler parted one of her cables and became entangled with Orestes. While the crews of both vessels were trying to disentangle the vessels, a squall pushed Growler alongside Orestes. Growler separated from Orestes and grounded on the shore a little east of Firestone Point. Her masts had to be cut away to get her off; she then went into dock for repairs. There were no deaths in the incident.

Growler shared in the prize money for the sloop Poule Blanche, F.Becker, master, and the chasse maree Marie Francoise, G.Roge, master, that Arrow captured on 14 May 1812. HMS San Josef, Bulwark, and Constant also shared in the prize money. (Note: Poule Blanche, of 70 tons (bm), and Marie Francoise, of 64 tons (bm), were auctioned at Plymouth on 25 July 1812.)

A three-vessel squadron comprising the French frigates Ariane and Andromaque, and the brig Mameluke (or Mamelouck), returning from a commerce raiding campaign in the Atlantic, on 22 May met the 74-gun HMS Northumberland while trying to slip to Lorient through the British blockade.

An engagement ensued in which the French vessels grounded on the coast. Growler came up and continued to bombard the French vessels while Northumberland hauled off to repair her rigging, which had sustained extensive damage. The French vessels fell on their sides when the tide went out, enabling their crews to scramble ashore. Northumberland returned and continued the bombardment. Eventually the two frigates caught fire and exploded. Mameluke was severely damaged, but the French eventually recovered her and returned her to service. The Admiralty in 1847 authorized the issuance of the NGSM with the clasp "Growler 22 May 1812" to all surviving claimants, of which there was one.

On 4 October Zeven Freunde, a Prussian vessel, came into Plymouth. Growler had detained her as she was sailing from Cadiz to Bordeaux.

In 1812 Lieutenant Hugh Anderson took command of Growler.

On 12 November Growler and Diana captured a French brig of unknown name.

On 12 November Growler and Diana put a prize crew on the captured French brig Suir Maree, with orders to sail her to Plymouth. The prize crew consisted of two men from Growler, a master's mate and quartermaster from Diana and five seamen from Diana. During the night of 29 November, when the brig was off the Scilly Isles, the seamen from Growler and three from Diana, two Blacks and a Portuguese, murdered the master's mate, quartermaster, and a passenger, detained the other two seamen from Diana below deck, and set sail for a French port. Next day, when the mutineers saw two sails in the distance, in chase, the Portuguese and one of the Blacks lowered a boat and rowed away. The two men held below deck overpowered the remaining three mutineers. They hit the remaining Black on the head and threw him overboard, and seized and bound the remaining two men, who had come from Growler. The two frigates in chase came up and took possession of the brig. One was Aquilon and the other was Diana. A boat from Aquilon took the two loyal seamen and the two remaining mutineers to Diana. In December the two mutineers were tried at Plymouth and hanged.

On and 13 January 1813 Growler captured Desiree and Evilina. Growler next served in the Baltic.

On 10 March Growler destroyed the Danish privateer Snecken.

== Fate ==
Growler went into ordinary in 1815 at Portsmouth.

The "Principal Officers and Commissioners of His Majesty's Navy" offered "Growler gun-brig, of 178 tons", lying at Portsmouth, for sale on 23 March 1815. Growler was sold there on 31 August.
