= HMS Morne Fortunee (1803) =

History

United Kingdom
- Name: HMS Morne Fortunee
- Namesake: "Morne Fortunee," Castries, St. Lucia
- Acquired: 1803 by purchase of a prize
- Fate: Wrecked 6 December 1804

General characteristics
- Tons burthen: 105, or 10590/94 (bm)
- Length: Overall:65 ft 6 in (20.0 m); Keel:45 ft 0 in (13.7 m)
- Beam: 21 ft 0 1/2 in (6.4 m)
- Propulsion: Sails
- Sail plan: Schooner
- Complement: 35
- Armament: 6 × 12-pounder carronades
- Notes: Built of Bermuda cedar

HMS Morne Fortunee was originally the Bermudian schooner Glory, launched in 1801 but captured in 1803 as the French privateer Morne Fortunée. She was wrecked in 1804.

The British Royal Navy purchased her for £3000 on 29 August 1803 at Bermuda. She arrived at Portsmouth on 29 November 1803 and was fitted there on 29 February 1804. Lieutenant John Dale commissioned her.

On 19 March 1804 departed Spithead for Plymouth, Cork, and the West Indies, with a convoy of about 30 sail.

Circa 29 September 1804 she again departed Plymouth.

She was wrecked at Attwood's Key, off Crooked Island in the Bahamas on 6 December 1804. She had been carrying dispatches from Jamaica when at 3 a.m. breakers were sighted ahead. Although the helmsman put her helm over it was too late and she struck hard on a reef and started rapidly to take on water. Her crew cut away her masts, lightened her, and let go her anchors, all to keep her from slipping off into deeper water. In the morning the crew took to her boats as she was settling fast. The loss was blamed on a combination of an error in navigation and a strong current.
