= James Richard Dacres (Royal Navy officer, born 1788) =

Royal Navy officer (1788-1853)

Vice-Admiral James Richard Dacres
- Born: 22 August 1788; Lowestoft, England
- Died: 4 December 1853 (aged 65); Catisfield Lodge near Fareham, Hampshire, England
- Relatives: James Richard Dacres (father); Barrington Dacres (brother); Richard Dacres (uncle); Sydney Dacres (cousin)
- Military career
- Allegiance: United Kingdom
- Branch: Royal Navy
- Service years: 1796 – 1853
- Rank: Vice-Admiral
- Commands: HMS Elk; HMS Bacchante; HMS Guerriere; HMS Tiber; HMS Edinburgh; Cape of Good Hope Station
- Conflicts: USS Constitution vs HMS Guerriere

James Richard Dacres (22 August 1788 – 4 December 1853) was an officer of the Royal Navy who saw service during the French Revolutionary and Napoleonic Wars, and the War of 1812. A member of a substantial naval dynasty, he eventually rose to the rank of vice admiral, but is chiefly remembered for his engagement with the American frigate USS Constitution which saw the loss of his ship, HMS Guerriere.

== Family and early life ==
Dacres was born in Lowestoft on 22 August 1788, the son of Captain, later Vice-Admiral, James Richard Dacres and his wife Eleanor Blandford Pearce. The Dacres would eventually become a substantial naval dynasty, James's elder brother Barrington Dacres embarked on a naval career and rose to be post-captain, while their uncle, Richard Dacres became a vice-admiral. His cousin, Richard's son Sydney Dacres would eventually be an admiral, and First Sea Lord. James Richard Dacres entered the navy in 1796 at the age of eight, serving aboard his father's old ship, the 64-gun HMS Sceptre, as a first class volunteer. He moved aboard the 98-gun HMS Barfleur in 1797 and was present during the expedition to Ferrol in August 1800 as a lieutenant aboard the 74-gun HMS Impetueux.

He was next reported aboard the 38-gun frigate HMS Boadicea, serving in the English Channel under Captain John Maitland. On 24 July 1803 the French 74-gun third-rate Duguay-Trouin and the 38-gun frigate Guerrière were sighted sailing off Ferrol, Spain. Maitland decided to test whether the French ships were armed en flûte and were being used as troopships, and closing to within range, opened fire. The French returned fire, revealing they were fully armed and manned, and Maitland broke off. The French pursued, but were unable to catch him. This marked Dacres's first encounter with the Guerrière, a ship he was later to command under the British flag.

Dacres then moved to the West Indies, where his father was commander in chief of the Jamaica Station. He served for some time as flag lieutenant aboard HMS Theseus and HMS Hercule before being appointed to his first command, that of the 18-gun Cruizer-class brig-sloop HMS Elk.

== Command ==
Dacres remained in command aboard the Elk until being transferred to the 24-gun HMS Bacchante on 14 January 1806. While in command of her he captured the 3-gun French schooner Dauphin, crewed with 71 men, off St. Domingo on 14 February 1807. He then fell in with Captain William Furlong Wise of Mediator and together they navigated the waters around Samana and planned an attack on the fort there, which was a notorious haven for privateers. The two ships mounted a four-hour-long carronade, before storming the defenders. They captured the fort, suffering two killed and 16 wounded in the process. Dacres returned to England after this, but on his arrival in December 1807 no command could be found for him and he went on half-pay.

=== North America and the Guerriere ===
He returned to active service again on 18 March 1811, when he was appointed to command the former French frigate HMS Guerriere, which had been captured by HMS Blanche on 19 July 1806. Dacres sailed to the North American station, and shortly after the outbreak of the War of 1812 was despatched by Vice-Admiral Herbert Sawyer as part of a squadron under Captain Philip Broke to intercept an American squadron under Commodore John Rodgers. Broke's squadron consisted of the 64-gun ship of the line HMS Africa and the frigates Shannon, Aeolus, Belvidera and Guerriere.

Dacres briefly became separated from Broke's squadron, and while returning to them on 17 August came across the USS Constitution, under Captain Isaac Hull. He mistook the other nearby ships, which was Broke's squadron, for the American squadron under Rodgers, and so missed an opportunity to close on the Constitution. A chase ensued between the British and American ships, but the Constitution was finally able to escape Broke's squadron. Dacres remained with Broke, joining him in August in escorting an inbound convoy to Halifax, after which Dacres and the Guerriere were detached to sail to Halifax and undergo a refit.

=== Battling the Constitution ===
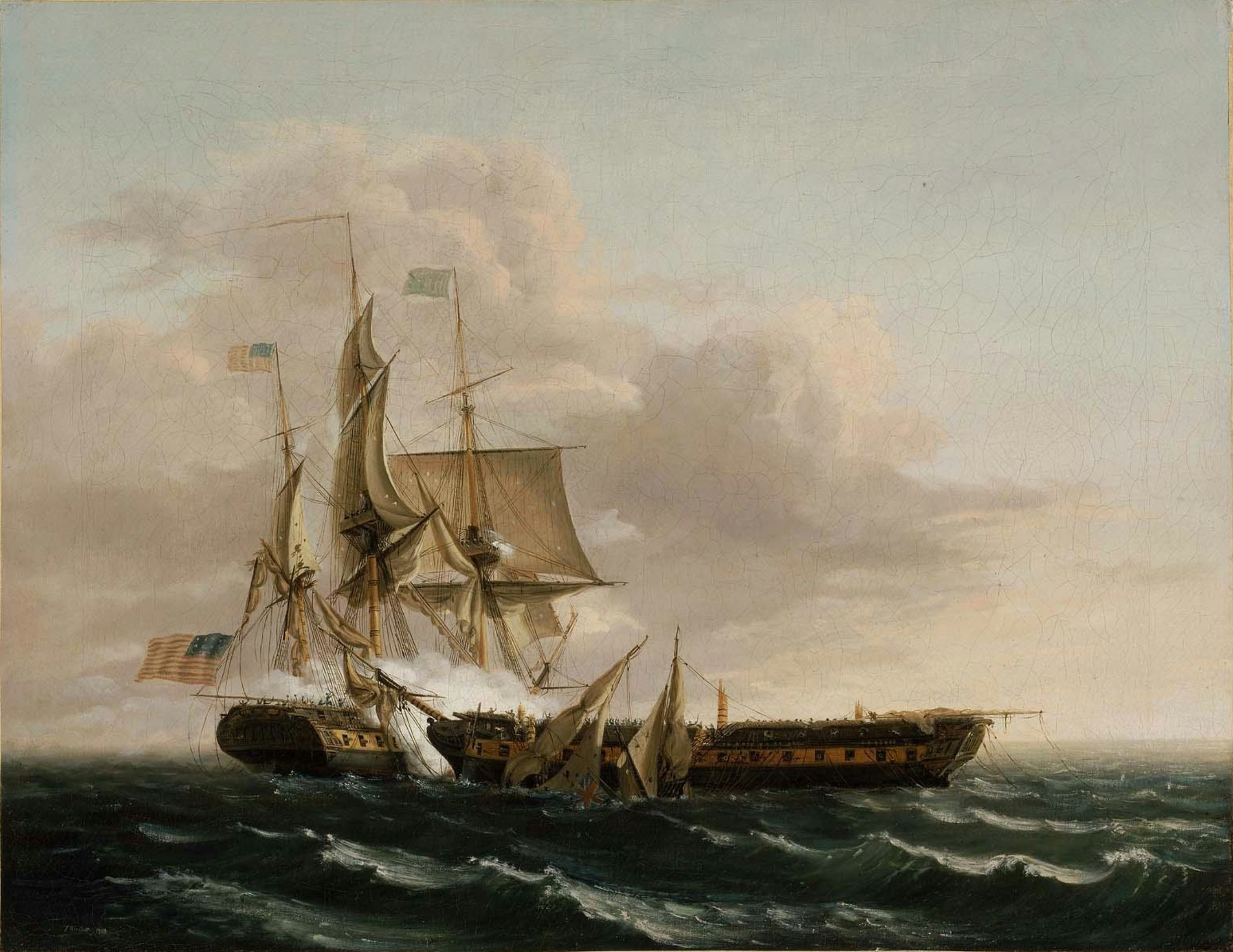
Painting of combat between USS Constitution and HMS Guerriere

On the afternoon of 19 August the Guerriere made contact with the Constitution. Dacres prepared to fight and the two ships closed and exchanged broadsides for some time. The range eventually decreased and after a brief close exchange the Guerriere's mizzenmast was shot away, allowing the Constitution to rake her several times, causing considerable damage, before the two ships became entangled. Shortly after this Guerriere lost both her main and foremasts, leaving her largely un-manoeuvrable. During the engagement Dacres had been wounded by a musket-ball in the back while on the starboard forecastle, but had refused to leave the deck. Constitution then drew away to repair some damage, while Dacres attempted to set a jury rig. The attempt failed, and on Constitution's returning, Dacres fired a shot in the opposite direction to the Constitution. Sensing that this was an attempt to signal surrender, Hull ordered a boat to take a lieutenant over to the British ship. When the lieutenant walked onto the Guerriere and asked if Guerriere was prepared to surrender, Captain Dacres responded "Well, Sir, I don't know. Our mizzen mast is gone, our fore and main masts are gone-I think on the whole you might say we have struck our flag."

Dacres was brought aboard the Constitution where he presented his sword to Hull. Hull refused to accept it, saying he could not accept the sword from a man who had fought so gallantly. Hull did, however, take possession of Dacres' hat to settle a wager the two had made earlier over whose ship was better. Hull also ordered that Dacres' mother's Bible be returned to him. The Guerriere was assessed but found to be unsalvageable, and was blown up.

=== Aftermath ===
Dacres briefly became a prisoner of war, but was exchanged and returned to Halifax, where he was tried by court martial for the loss of his ship, which was standard procedure in the Royal Navy for the loss of a ship at the time. He put forward as his defence the facts that the Guerriere was originally French-built and therefore not as sturdy as British-built ships, and that the Guerriere was badly decayed and on her way to refit in Halifax at the time, and the fall of the mizzen mast which crippled the Guerriere early in the fight had been due as much to rot as battle damage. There was no suggestion that Dacres and his men had not done their utmost, or that Dacres had been unwise to engage the Constitution. He was therefore honourably acquitted of all blame for the loss. He was awarded a gratuity from the Lloyd's Patriotic Fund in consideration of his wound.

== Promotion ==
Dacres continued to serve in the navy after his acquittal, and was appointed to the new 38-gun frigate HMS Tiber on 23 July 1814. He commanded her on the Cork, Newfoundland and Channel stations until 18 September 1818. On 8 March 1815 he captured the Leo, a 3-gun American privateer under Captain George Coggeshell. He was appointed to command the 74-gun third rate HMS Edinburgh on 28 October 1833 until 1837. He became a rear-admiral on 28 June 1838, and commander-in-chief of the Cape of Good Hope Station on 9 August 1845, which was his last active employment. A temporary fort built in 1846 at the mouth of the Fish River in the Eastern Cape Province during the Seventh Xhosa War was named Fort Dacres in his honour. The construction was carried out by sailors of the British man-of-war HMS President.

He was promoted to vice-admiral on 20 March 1848.

== Family and later life ==
Dacres married Arabella-Boyd, sister of Sir Adolphus Dalrymple, on 25 April 1810. She died on 11 April 1828, but the marriage produced two sons and five daughters. One son, also called James Richard Dacres, died at Mozambique at the age of 37 on 14 February 1848, while in command of the sloop HMS Nimrod. Another, Hew Dalrymple Dacres died at sea at the age of 21 on 11 July 1835, having been a lieutenant in the 67th Regiment. They and their father are commemorated in a plaque in the parish church at Tetbury, Gloucestershire. One daughter, also called Arabella, married Colonel Thomas Butler of Hambledon, Hampshire. James Richard Dacres died at Catisfield Lodge, near Fareham, Hampshire on 4 December 1853 at the age of 65. He was buried in the family vault at Tetbury.

== See also ==
- O'Byrne, William Richard (1849). "Dacres, James Richard (a)" . A Naval Biographical Dictionary . John Murray – via Wikisource.

== Sources ==
- Colledge, J. J.; Warlow, Ben (2006) [1969]. Ships of the Royal Navy: The Complete Record of All Fighting Ships of the Royal Navy from the 15th Century to the Present (3rd Rev ed.). London: Chatham Publishing. ISBN 978-1-86176-281-8. OCLC 67375475.
- Tracy, Nicholas (2006). Who's who in Nelson's Navy: 200 Naval Heroes. London: Chatham Publishing. ISBN 1-86176-244-5.
- The Gentleman's Magazine. Vol. 6. London: F. Jefferies. 1837.
- The Gentleman's Magazine. Vol. 196. London: F. Jefferies. 1854.
- Dodsley, James (1854). Annual Register. Vol. 95. London: F. J. Rivington.
- Borneman, Walter R. (2004). 1812: The War That Forged a Nation. New York: Harper Perennial. ISBN 9780060531126.
- Forester, Cecil Scott (1956). The Age of Fighting Sail. Doubleday. ISBN 978-0-9392-1806-6.

Military offices
Preceded by Josceline Percy	Commander-in-Chief, Cape of Good Hope Station; 1846	Succeeded by Barrington Reynolds
