= Premier Consul (1800) =

History

France
- Name: Premier Consul
- Namesake: Napoleon's title during the French Consulate
- Builder: Nantes
- Laid down: 1800
- Launched: 1800
- Captured: March 1801

United Kingdom
- Name: HMS Scout
- Acquired: March 1801 by capture
- Fate: Presumed foundered 1801

General characteristics
- Type: Ship-sloop
- Displacement: 376 tons (French)
- Tons burthen: 44773/94 (bm)
- Length: 113 ft 8 in (34.6 m) (overall), or 34.64 × 9.23 metres; 91 ft 9 in (28.0 m) (keel)
- Beam: 30 ft 3 1/2 in (9.2 m)
- Depth of hold: 11 ft 3 in (3.4 m)
- Propulsion: Sails
- Sail plan: Sloop
- Complement: Privateer: 146-150; British service: 121
- Armament: Privateer: 14 × 9-pounder guns; British service; Upper deck: 18 × 24-pounder carronades; Fc: 2 × 6-pounder bow chasers

Premier Consul was a French privateer launched in 1800 at Nantes. The Royal Navy captured her in 1801 and renamed her HMS Scout. She foundered later that year with the loss of her entire crew.

== Career ==
Premier Consul was commissioned in December 1800 in Saint-Malo. She departed around 18 February 1801 under the command of J. Pinson.

She was on her first voyage when HMS Dryad captured her west of Ireland on 5 March after a 3-hour chase. She had a crew of 150 men and was pierced for 24 guns, but only carried 14. She was 21 days out of Saint Malo and had captured a Portuguese schooner sailing from Lisbon to Ireland.

Between June and October 1801 she underwent fitting out at Portsmouth. The Royal Navy commissioned her in September under Commander Henry Duncan. He had just lost his previous vessel, Scout, so the Navy renamed Premier Consul as Scout.

Duncan sailed Scout for Newfoundland on 20 October 1801. She never arrived and was presumed lost with all hands. Duncan received promotion to post captain in April 1802, but obviously did not live to take up the rank.
