= French corvette Bacchante (1795) =

French Navy Serpente-class corvette

History

France
- Name: Bacchante
- Builder: Pierre, Jacques, & Nicolas Fortier, Honfleur
- Laid down: October 1794
- Launched: 29 December 1795
- Completed: 1796
- Captured: June 1803

United Kingdom
- Name: HMS Bachante
- Acquired: June 1803 by capture
- Commissioned: November 1803
- Fate: Sold 1809

General characteristics
- Class & type: Serpente-class corvette
- Tons burthen: 642 (exact) (bm)
- Length: 131 ft 6 in (40.1 m) (overall); 111 ft 11 1/8 in (34.1 m) (keel)
- Beam: 32 ft 10 1/5 in (10.0 m)
- Depth of hold: 14 ft 8 3/4 in (4.489 m)
- Complement: At capture: 200; British service: 175
- Armament: Originally: 18 × 18-pounder guns; 1803: 18 × 12-pounder guns; British service: 18 × 32-pounder carronades + 2 × 12-pounder bow chasers

The French corvette Bacchante was launched in 1795 as one of the four Serpente-class corvettes built for the French Navy. She served for almost two years as a privateer, before returning to the service of the French Navy. After HMS Endymion captured her in 1803, the Royal Navy took her in under her existing name as a 20-gun post ship. Bacchante served in the West Indies, where she captured several armed Spanish and French vessels before the Navy sold her in 1809.

== French service ==
Bacchante was built to a design by Charles-Henri Tellier. She was a "flat-bottomed vessel, destined to protect the entrances to rivers".

Between 1797 and 1798 Bacchante served as a privateer under Captain Pierre Lefortier.

By 1801 Bacchante was back in naval service and at Havre under the command of lieutenant de vaisseau Bellenger. In 1802 and 1803, sailed Brest-San Domingo-Brest. At the outbreak of war after the collapse of the Treaty of Amiens, Bacchante came under the command of lieutenant de vaisseau François-Louis Kerimel and joined Volage and Observateur.

== Capture ==
On 25 June 1803 Endymion captured Bacchante near the Azores, after a chase of eight hours. Bacchante was returning to Brest after a three-month voyage to San Domingo. Kerimel's attempts to escape resulted in Bacchante losing eight men killed and nine wounded; her return fire caused no casualties on Endymion. Captain Charles Paget of Endymion described Bacchante as a "remarkably fine Ship, of large Dimensions, quite New, and sails very fast."

== British career ==
Bacchante arrived at Plymouth on 23 July 1803. She then remained there undergoing fitting between October 1803 and February 1804. Captain Charles Dashwood commissioned Bacchante in November 1803. On 18 February Bacchante was at Plymouth under orders to proceed station herself off Falmouth to meet the Lisbon and Oporto convoys and escort them to their ports.

Dashwood then sailed her for Jamaica in June 1804.

On 3 April 1805, Bacchante captured the Spanish naval schooner Elizabeth of ten guns and 47 men under the command of Don Josef Fer Fexegron. Elizabeth had been carrying dispatches from the Spanish governor of Pensacola, but had thrown these overboard before her capture. (Note: Head money for Isabella, alias Elizabeth, was paid in January 1821. A first-class share was worth £76 18s 5¼d; a fifth-class share, that of a seaman, was worth 7s 1¼d.)

Dashwood found out that there were three privateers at Mariel, a little west of Havana, and decided to try to capture them. The first step was to send in Bacchante's boats to take a round tower that was protecting the harbour. The tower stood 40' high, had three 24-pounders on its top, loopholes for muskets around its circumference, and had a garrison of a captain and 30 men. The attack commenced in the evening of 5 April, with the British capturing the fort despite heavy fire. The 13 British seamen and marines suffered one man wounded before they landed; the Spanish had two killed and three wounded. Leaving a sergeant and six marines to guard the prisoners, the boats then headed into the harbour. There they discovered that the privateers had left the day before. Still, despite heavy small-arms fire, the British succeeded in bringing out two schooners carrying sugar.

One month later Bacchante was off Havana. Here, on 14 May, she captured the Spanish letter of marque Felix. Felix, pierced for ten guns though carrying six, had a crew of 42 men under the command of Francisco Lopez and was carrying a cargo of beeswax and coffee when Bacchante captured her after a four-hour chase. Felix had left Havana the day before and was the first vessel to have left that port since the imposition of the British embargo. (Note: Head money for Felix was paid in January 1821. A first-class share was worth £58 16s 6¾d; a fifth-class share was worth 4s 8¼d. The head money notice gives the date of Felix's capture as 4 May, but Dashwood's letter is unambiguous in putting the date as 14 May.)

By 27 May Bacchante had arrived at Deal in company with the hired armed ship Lady Warren. They brought in four returning East Indiamen as well as a number of other vessels from Jamaica, Lisbon, and Oporto. On 22 June Bacchante and the frigate Beaulieu left Portsmouth escorting a convoy for the West Indies.

Circa July 1805 Commander Randall M'Donnell assumed command of Bacchante. On 18 November she captured the Spanish privateer Dos Azares. Bacchante was off the north-east end of Cuba when she sighted a schooner near land. Knowing that Bacchante was not fast, M'Donnell, rather than chasing the schooner, pretended to take flight, luring the privateer into chasing him. When the privateer realised her mistake, M'Donnell gave chase and after about seven hours succeeded in capturing her. Dos Azares was armed with two 3-pounder guns and had a crew of 36 men under the command of Captain Ealletam Garcia. She was four days out of Cuba and had not yet captured anything. In the engagement, Dos Azares had three men wounded; Bacchante had no casualties.

In August 1806 Commander James Dacres replaced M'Donnell. On 29 August, in the evening, Bacchante was patrolling off Santa-Martha. Dacres sent her boats to capture or destroy some Spanish vessels at anchor in the harbour. At 1 A.M. on 30 August the boats arrived at the entrance of the harbour and immediately made for the vessels. As they did so, they came under a tremendous, but completely ineffective fire from the vessels, the batteries, and the beach, where several field-pieces had been stationed. The boats brought out three armed vessels, one a brig and two feluccas without having suffered any casualties. (A latter report said she had one man wounded.) Dacres reported that the three vessels were:

- Brig of unknown name and four guns. A later report referred to her as a French brig whose crew had escaped.
- Spanish letter of marque Sebastian of one gun and 30 men, which had been traveling from St Sebastian to Vera Cruz;
- Spanish privateer Desiade of one gun and 30 men, which had been bound for St Jago do Cuba.

The brig was the William, of four guns, which had been sailing from Liverpool to Africa when the Spanish captured her. Bacchante and her prizes arrived at Jamaica on 5 September.

On 14 February 1807, Bacchante captured the French navy schooner Dauphin off Cape Raphael after a 10-hour chase. Dauphin mounted one long 12-pounder gun and two 4-pounders, but she threw the 4-pounders overboard during the chase. She had a crew of 71 men and Dacres was extremely happy to have captured her as she had been preying successfully on British trade.

Dacres then fell in with Captain Wise and Mediator in the Mona Passage. Both were patrolling, looking for French warships and privateers, so Dacres took Mediator under his command and hatched a plan to raid the port of Samana, "that nest of privateers". Dacres had Dauphin come into the harbour under her French flag, with Bacchante disguised as her prize and Mediator, a former merchantman, appearing to be a neutral ship. This stratagem permitted the British vessels to navigate into the harbour and anchor within a half a mile of the fort before the enemy realised that they were British vessels. After a four-hour exchange of fire with a fort manned primarily by men from the privateers in the harbour, the fort fell to a land attack by the seamen and marines from Bacchante and Mediator, the landing party being under Wise's command. The British captured two French schooners undergoing fitting as privateers, and an American ship and a British schooner, both prizes to French privateers. (Note: The American vessel was the George Washington, whose cargo of coffee was still aboard her.) Before they left on 21 February, the British destroyed the fort and its guns. Mediator bore the brunt of the fort's fire. Dacres had four men wounded; Wise had two men killed and 12 wounded. Dacres estimated that French casualties had been high, but did not have a number as the Frenchmen took to the woods as the fort fell.

The Lloyd's Patriotic Fund subsequently awarded both Dacres and Wise a sword each worth £100 that bore the inscriptions:

- "From the Patriotic Fund at Lloyd's to James Richard Dacres Esqr. Capt. of H.M.S. Bacchante for his Gallant Conduct in the Capture of the French National Schooner Dauphin and the Destruction of the Fort and Cannon in the Harbour of Samana on 16th February 1807 effected by the Bacchante in company with H.M.S. Mediator as Recorded in the London Gazette of the 25th of April".
- "From the Patriotic Fund at Lloyd's to William Furlong Wise Esq. Capt. of H.M.S. Mediator for his Gallant Conduct in Storming and Destroying with the Seamen and Marines belonging to His Majesty's Ships Bacchante and Mediator the Fort and Cannon in the Harbour of Samana on 16th of February 1807 as Recorded in the London Gazette of the 25th of April".

By September 1807 Bacchante was under the command of Commander Samuel Hood Inglefield. On 13 September, Reindeer was chasing a suspicious schooner when Bacchante came up and cut the quarry off, which then struck. The vessel turned out to be the Spanish privateer Amor de la Patria under Captain Josse de Tournecy. She was armed with three guns and had a crew of 63 men. She was five days out of (St Iago) but had not taken any prizes.

On 5 October Bacchante recaptured the Atalanta, Kneal, master.

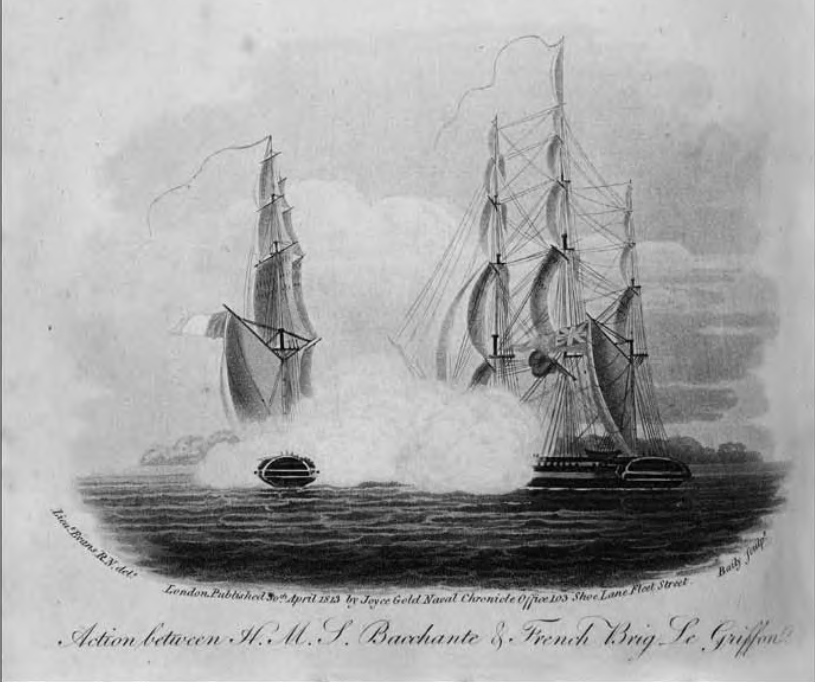
Action between HMS Bacchante and French Brig Le Griffon, sketched by Lieut. Evans

On 11 May 1808 Bacchante captured the French navy brig Griffon off Cape Antonio. Bacchante pursued Griffon for almost seven hours, and fought her for a half an hour, Griffon only struck when she found herself crowded some 100 metres from the breakers with Bacchante only some 200 meters from her. Griffon was armed with fourteen 24-pounder carronades and two 6-pounder guns, and had a crew of 105 men under the command of lieutenant de vaisseau Jacques Gautier. In the engagement Griffon had five men wounded, while Bacchante had suffered no casualties.

Griffon had sailed from Rochefort to Martinique via Pensacola. Bacchante sent her into Jamaica. There the Royal Navy took Griffon, which was relatively new, into service as HMS Griffon.

On 10 June 1808 Commander William Ward of Pelican received promotion to post captain in Bacchante, replacing Inglefield, who transferred to Daedalus. Ward then sailed Bacchante back to Britain.

== Fate ==
The Commissioners of the Navy offered Bacchante for sale at Portsmouth in July 1809. She was sold on 2 July.
