= Ann and Amelia (1781 ship) =

History

Great Britain
- Name: Ann and Amelia
- Owner: John Julius Angerstin, or Angerstein
- Builder: Fishburn & Brodrick, Whitby (Note: The National Archives gives her builder as "Wells", but he may have done no more than measure her prior to the EIC accepting her as an "extra ship".)
- Launched: 1781
- Fate: Sold June 1804

United Kingdom
- Name: HMS Mediator
- Acquired: June 1804 by purchase
- Honours and awards: Naval General Service Medal with clasp "Basque Roads 1809"
- Fate: Expended as a fireship in the Basque Roads, April 1809

General characteristics
- Tons burthen: 600, or 620, or 689 (bm)
- Length: 126 ft 11 in (38.7 m) (overall); 102 ft 8 in (31.3 m) (keel); 134 ft 8 in (41.0 m) (overall); 109 ft 4 in (33.3 m) (keel; est)
- Beam: 33 ft 2 in (10.1 m); 34 ft 5 in (10.5 m)
- Depth of hold: 13 ft 1 in (4.0 m)
- Sail plan: Ship
- Complement: 254 (Frigate)
- Armament: Ann and Amelia: 20 × 9-pounder + 6 × 4-pounder guns; Frigate: Lower deck: 26 × 18-pounder guns; Upper deck: 18 × 24-pounder carronades; Storeship: Upper deck: 20 × 18-pounder guns; QD: 2 × 9-pounder guns

Ann and Amelia was a three-decker merchant ship launched in 1781. The British East India Company (EIC) twice employed her as an "extra ship", first when she went out to India to sail in trade in that market, and again in 1803 when she sailed back from India to Britain. On her return to Britain the Admiralty purchased her in June 1804 and converted her to a 44-gun fifth rate with the name HMS Mediator. The Navy converted her to a storeship in 1808, but then expended her as a fireship at the battle of the Basque Roads in April 1809.

== Ann and Amelia ==
After her launch at Whitby in 1781, Ann and Amelia, under the command of Captain John Popham, was at The Downs on 30 January 1782. She left British waters on 6 February 1781 for India. She was to remain there in the local and Far East trade.

She served as a transport or troopship to support Major-General Sir David Baird's expedition in 1800 to the Red Sea. Baird was in command of the Indian army that was going to Egypt to help General Ralph Abercromby expel the French there. Baird landed at Kosseir, on the Egyptian side of the Red Sea. He then led his troops army across the desert to Kena on the Nile, and then to Cairo. He arrived before Alexandria in time for the final operations.

In 1803 the EIC employed Ann and Amelia again, this time to take a cargo from Bengal to Britain. She left Saugor on 29 January 1803. She reached Coringa on 27 February, and Madras on 11 March. She then reached St Helena on 10 July, and Yarmouth on 29 September, before arriving at The Downs on 3 October.

== HMS Mediator ==
In June–July 1804 Mediator underwent fitting by Brent, of Rotherhithe. Then she underwent further fitting between July and October, but at Deptford Dockyard. Her measurements, and hence burthen, increased.

Captain Thomas Livingstone commissioned Mediator in August 1804 for the North Sea. Captain John Seater replaced Livingstone in January 1805, and on 25 February sailed towards the East Indies. Equally, on 17 February, Mediator escorted a convoy of Indiamen out of Portsmouth. She escorted them as far as St Helena and then returned to Britain in September.

On 3 March 1806, Mediator and Squirrel left Cork, escorting a convoy for the West Indies. The convoy was reported "all well" on 25 March at 27°30′N 20°30′W.

In May 1806 Mediator was on the Jamaica Station. Seater died about that time, and Captain William Wise replaced him. On 14 November, Wise and Mediator captured West Indian.

On 14 February 1807 Captain Wise and Mediator fell in with Bacchante, Commander James Dacres, in the Mona Passage. Dacres also had the French schooner Dauphin, which he had just captured. Mediator and Bacchante were patrolling, looking for French warships and privateers, so Dacres took Mediator under his command and hatched a plan to raid the port of Samana, "that nest of privateers". Dacres had Dauphin come into the harbour there under her French flag, with Bacchante disguised as her prize, and Mediator, a former merchantman, appearing to be a neutral ship. This stratagem permitted the British vessels to come into the harbour and anchor within a half a mile of the fort before the enemy realized that vessels were British warships. After a four-hour exchange of fire with a fort there, manned primarily by men from the privateers in the harbour, the fort fell to a land attack by the seamen and marines from Bacchante and Mediator, the landing party being under Wise's command. The British captured two French schooners undergoing fitting as privateers, and an American ship and a British schooner, both prizes to French privateers. (Note: The American vessel was George Washington, whose cargo of coffee was still aboard her.) Before they left on 21 February, the British destroyed the fort and its guns. In the attack, Dacres had four men wounded. Wise had two men killed and 12 wounded as Mediator had been more heavily engaged than Bacchante in the exchange of fire with the fort. Dacres estimated that French casualties had been high, but did not have a number as the Frenchmen took to the woods as the fort fell.

The Lloyd's Patriotic Fund, subsequently awarded both Dacres and Wise a sword each worth £100 that bore the inscriptions:

- "From the Patriotic Fund at Lloyd's to James Richard Dacres Esqr. Capt. of H.M.S. Bacchante for his Gallant Conduct in the Capture of the French National Schooner Dauphin and the Destruction of the Fort and Cannon in the Harbour of Samana on 16th February 1807 effected by the Bacchante in company with H.M.S. Mediator as Recorded in the London Gazette of the 25th of April".
- "From the Patriotic Fund at Lloyd's to William Furlong Wise Esq. Capt. of H.M.S. Mediator for his Gallant Conduct in Storming and Destroying with the Seamen and Marines belonging to His Majesty's Ships Bacchante and Mediator the Fort and Cannon in the Harbour of Samana on 16th of February 1807 as Recorded in the London Gazette of the 25th of April".

In May Mediator and Wise captured the Grouper on 3 May and the Dispatch on 6 May.

In 1807 Captain George Reynolds replaced Wise, who had become ill and who remained in the West Indies for a little while to recuperate before returning home. By the end of the year Mediator had returned to Britain. In 1808 she was fitted as a storeship and command passed to Captain George Blamey. Her role became one of conveying supplies to the various squadrons blockading French ports. On 15 March 1808 Mediator recaptured the Swedish ship Maria Christiana. In May 1808 Captain John Pasco managed to obtain the command of Mediator for three months.

In January 1809 Mediator was at Corunna. The battle of Corunna, which took place on 16 January 1809, had British troops holding off the French to cover the embarkation of the British Army after its retreat. In this battle Sir John Moore was killed. Mediator and a number of other warships and transports arrived on 14 and 15 January from Vigo.

Mediator took on board a great number of sick and wounded soldiers, and then sailed to Lisbon. After the evacuation was complete a violent fever and ague inflicted Blamey so the Navy appointed Captain James Woolridge acting captain until Blamey recovered.

== Fate: A blaze of glory ==
On 11 April 1809 Woolridge, in Mediator, commanded the flotilla of fire and explosion ships that Admirals Gambier and Lord Cochrane sent in to Basque Roads to attack the fleet that was arrayed there. A flotilla of six fireships, together with one ship laden with combustibles, had gathered at Portsmouth but had been unable to sail. Gambier decided not to wait. He took eight of the largest transports at his command and converted them to fireships. The necessary combustibles came from three French chasse-marées, laden with tar and rosin, that the fleet had recently captured. At Lord Cochrane's suggestion, Mediator too was fitted as a fire-ship.

The fireships attacked at 8:30 p.m., but several had to be abandoned when their fuzes started prematurely. Mediator, with the benefit of the wind and a tide running at four knots, broke through the boom protecting the French fleet. Woolridge and his skeleton crew barely escaped before she burst into flames. As it was, a gunner was killed, and Woolridge, Lieutenant Nicholas Brent Clements, Lieutenant James Pearl, and seaman Michael Gibson all received burns when they were blown out of her after she started to burn.

When Blamey, who was in sick quarters, heard that Mediator was going to lead the attack, he hurried to join her. However he did not arrive until 12 April.

The battle continued the next day with the French losing four ships-of-the-line and a frigate. Ville de Varsovie (80), and Aquilon (74), were both burnt. Tonnerre (74), Calcutta (54), and Indienne (46), were scuttled. (Note: Head money was paid in mid-March 1819. A first-class share, that of a British captain or commander, was worth £86 13s 2¼d; a sixth-class share, that of an ordinary seaman, was worth 13s, an amount slightly greater than half-a-month's pay.)

King George presented Woolridge with a gold medal and chain, worth £100, that had been specially struck for the occasion. Lloyd's Patriotic Fund presented Woolridge with a sword worth £100. Lastly, he was promoted to the rank of post captain.

In 1847 the Admiralty authorized the award of the Naval General Service Medal with clasp "Basque Roads 1809" to all surviving claimants from the action.
