= Admiral Sawyer =

Admiral Sawyer may refer to:

- Herbert Sawyer (fl. 1783–1833), British Royal Navy admiral
- Herbert Sawyer (Royal Navy officer, died 1798) (c. 1730–1798), British Royal Navy admiral
- Phillip G. Sawyer (born 1961), U.S. Navy vice admiral
