= Richard Wright (painter) =

English painter (1723–1775)

- Born: c. 1723; Liverpool, England
- Died: c. 1775
- Style: Marine art
- Awards: Society of Arts; 1764, 1766, 1768 Best Marine Picture

Richard Wright (c. 1723 – c. 1775) was an English painter who specialised in marine art. An entirely self-taught artist, he first appeared as an exhibitor in London in 1760, and between that date and 1773 exhibited twenty-five works with the Incorporated Society of Artists and one with the Free Society.

== Works ==
One of Wright's earliest known works is a picture of the St Nicholas Church, Liverpool, known as 'The Sailor's Church', and where Wright himself was probably baptised. The scene depicts the church and surrounding buildings viewed across the River Mersey from "Man's Island". It was one of several works originally executed by Wright for his shoemaker.

Wright first came to public attention 1762 after when he regularly exhibited at the Society of Artists until 1773. Exhibited works included A Storm with a Shipwreck, Sunset, a Fresh Breeze, A Fresh Gale, River with Boats, &c., Moonlight. The latter is thought to be A moonlit river landscape with a windmill, boats and figures, exhibited between 1770 and 1773 and sold at Christie's, London, in 2012 for £6000. In 1764 a fifty guinea premium was offered by the Society of Arts for the best marine picture; this he won, as was the case with similar prizes given by the society in 1766 and 1768.

Wright's career encompassed the latter years of the Seven Years' War and several of his works depict naval battles and the vessels involved. His painting of the Battle of Quiberon Bay, fought on 20 November 1759 and painted in 1760, depicts the wrecked 74-gun Resolution in the right foreground with the 64-gun Essex ahead of her and the French Soleil-Royal and Héros in flames in the right distance. To the left are the captured French 80-gun Formidable, with a two-deck English vessel.

Wright painted a scene from the action off the Isle of Man that took place on the 28 February 1760 in which Aeolus under John Elliot, with Brilliant and Pallas, attacked a French squadron under François Thurot aboard the flagship Marischal de Belle Isle that resulted in Thurot's death and the surrender of all three French frigates. Wright also painted an accompanying picture of the ships in Ramsey Bay after the action. Measuring 50.5 in (128 cm) by 36.5 in (93 cm), the paintings were engraved by Millar and Goldar and dedicated to Captain Elliot and the Merchants of the Port of Liverpool respectively. Wright is noted as having been on board the Belle Isle sketching in the aftermath of the battle.

In 1761 Wright painted several pictures of the storms encountered on the journey from Stade to Harwich of the Royal Yacht Fubbs that conveyed Princess Charlotte of Mecklenburg-Strelitz to England to marry George III. One in the Royal Collection at Hampton Court Palace, The Royal Yacht bringing Queen Charlotte to England in a Storm is thought to be the picture first exhibited by Wright in 1762 as A View of the Storm when the Queen was on her passage to England. The flotilla was led by Admiral Lord Anson aboard the Royal Caroline and his wife, Mary, accompanied Princess Charlotte aboard the Fubbs. Joshua Reynolds painted separate portraits of both Anson and his wife and Wright contributed background detail to each of them. The version of Anson's portrait in the National Gallery pre-dates Wright's intervention.

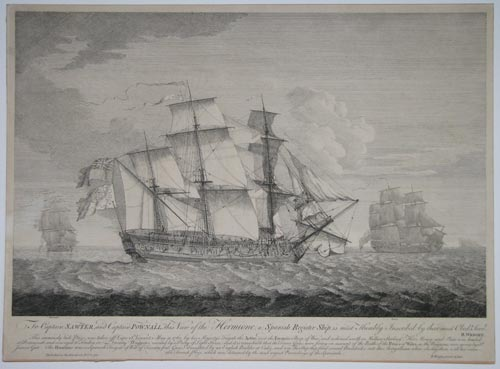
'Favourite' and 'Active' taking 'Hermione'

In 1762 Wright painted a picture depicting the capture of the Spanish frigate Hermione by the 28-gun frigate HMS Active and the 18-gun sloop-of-war Favourite off the coast of Spain near the port of Cadiz in the action of 31 May 1762.

His most notable work is a sea-piece, for which he obtained a premium of fifty guineas in 1764; from it William Woollett engraved his fine plate ‘The Fishery.’ No doubt owing to excellence of the engraver's work, a copy of this was published in France, on which the name of Vernet was affixed as painter. The ship has been identified as HMS Neptune (1757). The engraving embellishes the original painting, adding the words "Fish Machine" to a horse-drawn fish cart in the detail of the foreground fishing scene from which the popular name derives.

Around 1767 Wright painted Man of War in a Harbour depicting a Man-of-War of about 60 guns flying an Admiral's flag departing from harbour led by several more distant similar-sized ships and smaller craft in line ahead formation. The ship's figurehead, viewed from the rear, appears to be of a figure wearing kilt and glengarry, suggesting a Scottish name, but the ship has yet to be identified. Like The Fishery, the foreground detail depicts fishermen unloading their catch. The detail of the fish is sufficient to identify the species. Sold by Wright to Jervoise Clarke for sixty guineas the painting remained in the family collection until sold at auction in 1975. It was purchased by the Walker Art Gallery, Liverpool, in 2006.

An indistinctly-dated oil on panel entitled Shipping in a bay by a ruined tower was sold by Christie's, New York, in 2007 for $2500.

== Personal ==
Sources vary in their estimates of Wright's year of birth. Bryan, who many other sources draw on, states 1735, but an article in The Connoisseur observes that this was probably too late, as he would only have been eighteen on the birth of his eldest son. It is probable that the 4 April 1723 baptismal entry for Richard Wright, son of Edward Wright, at St. Nicholas Church, Liverpool, relates to him.

The following year Wright's longtime friend, artist George Stubbs, is also thought to have been baptised at St Nicholas. Wright was also a near neighbour of William Caddick. Richard initially worked as a house and ship painter and had no formal training as an artist. With little patronage for his trade in Liverpool, he moved to London around 1760, his address being recorded as 'Near King's Road, Pimlico'. There he was able to resume his friendship with Stubbs by 1762.

He was described by Horace Walpole as a man of rough manners and warm temper, and during his membership of the Incorporated Society he took an active lead among those discontented with its affairs.

With his wife, Louisa, Wright had a son, Edward, and two daughters: Nancy and Elizabeth. All three children were baptised at St Nicholas. Walpole noted that both Wright's wife and children all painted and exhibited, mostly still life and fruit pieces. Louisa, maiden name unknown, exhibited still lifes at the Society of Artists from 1770 to 1777. Edward, (baptised 10 April 1746), and Nancy (born 29 May 1748, baptised 24 June) both exhibited landscapes at the Society of Artists in 1772 and 1773. Elizabeth (born 25 March 1751, baptised 26 April) exhibited landscapes at the Society of Artists between 1773 and 1776. The family friendship with Stubbs is evidenced by Elizabeth's use of Stubbs' address, 24 Somerset Street, Portman Square, on some of her submissions for exhibition.

Edward pre-deceased his father, aged about twenty. Wright died soon afterwards, following an unsuccessful exhibition in York about the same time as his son's death, in about 1775 and was survived by his wife.

== Gallery ==
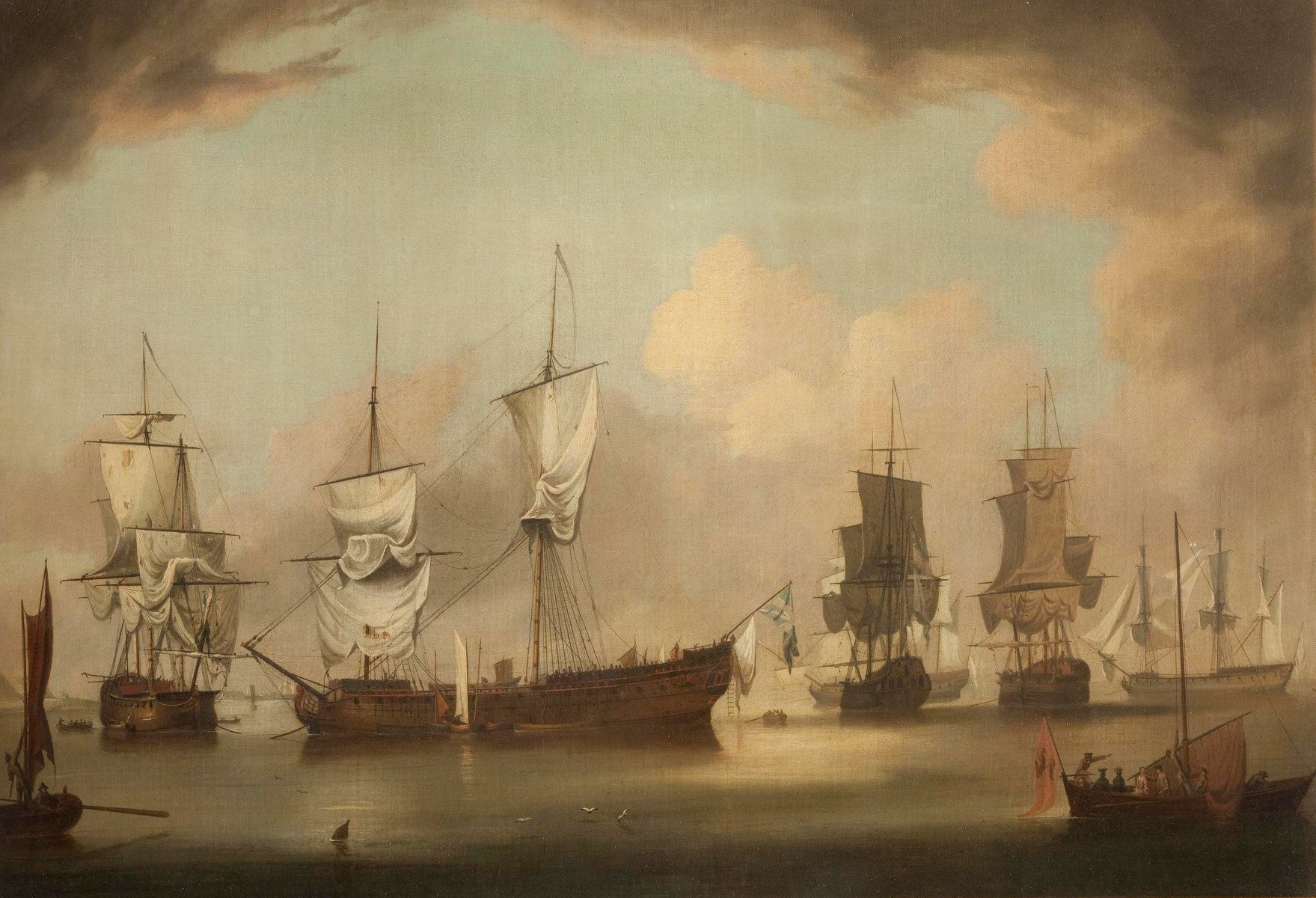
The Squadrons of Thurot and Elliot in Ramsey Bay (c. 1760)

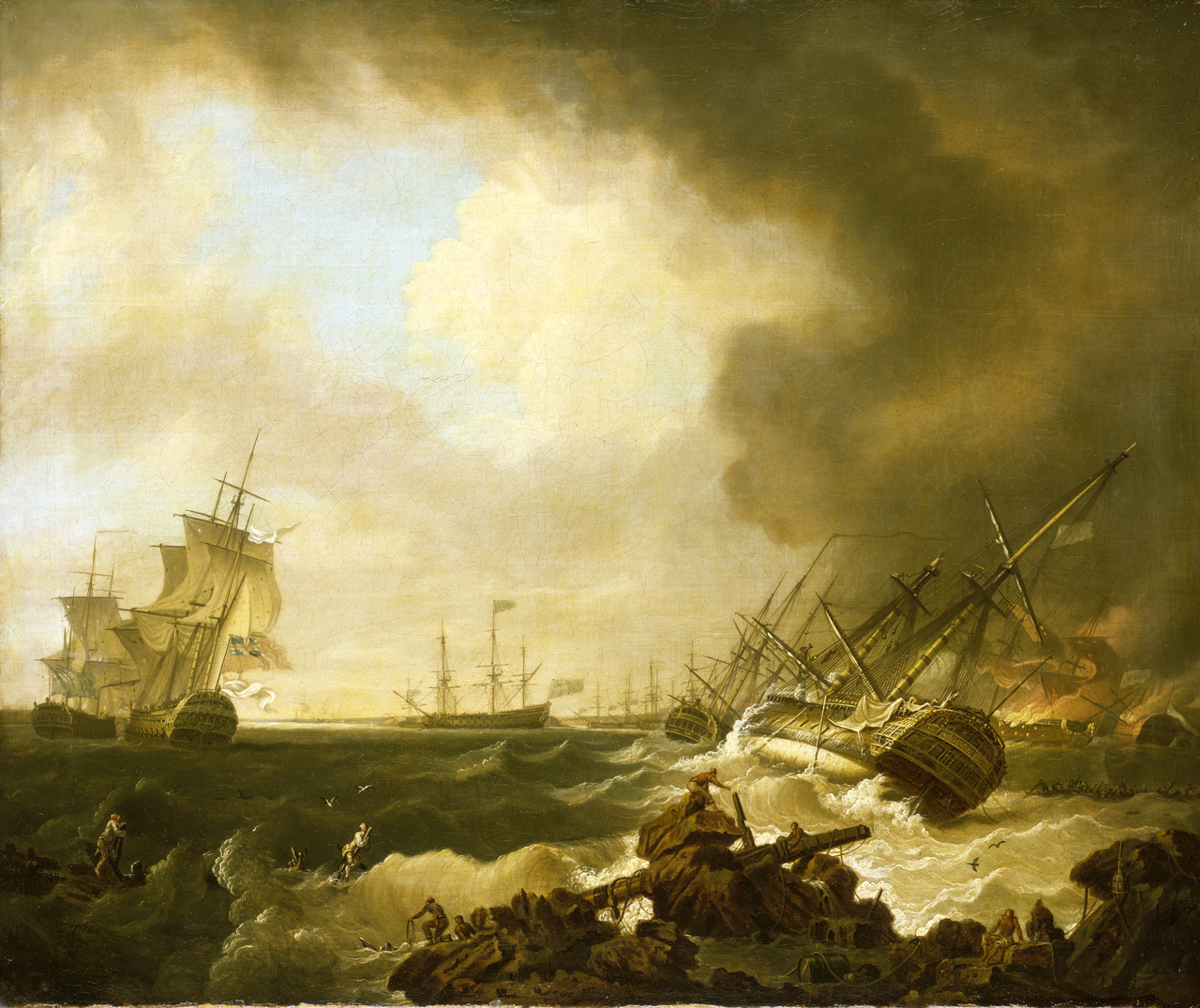
The Battle of Quiberon Bay, 21 November 1759: the Day After (1760)

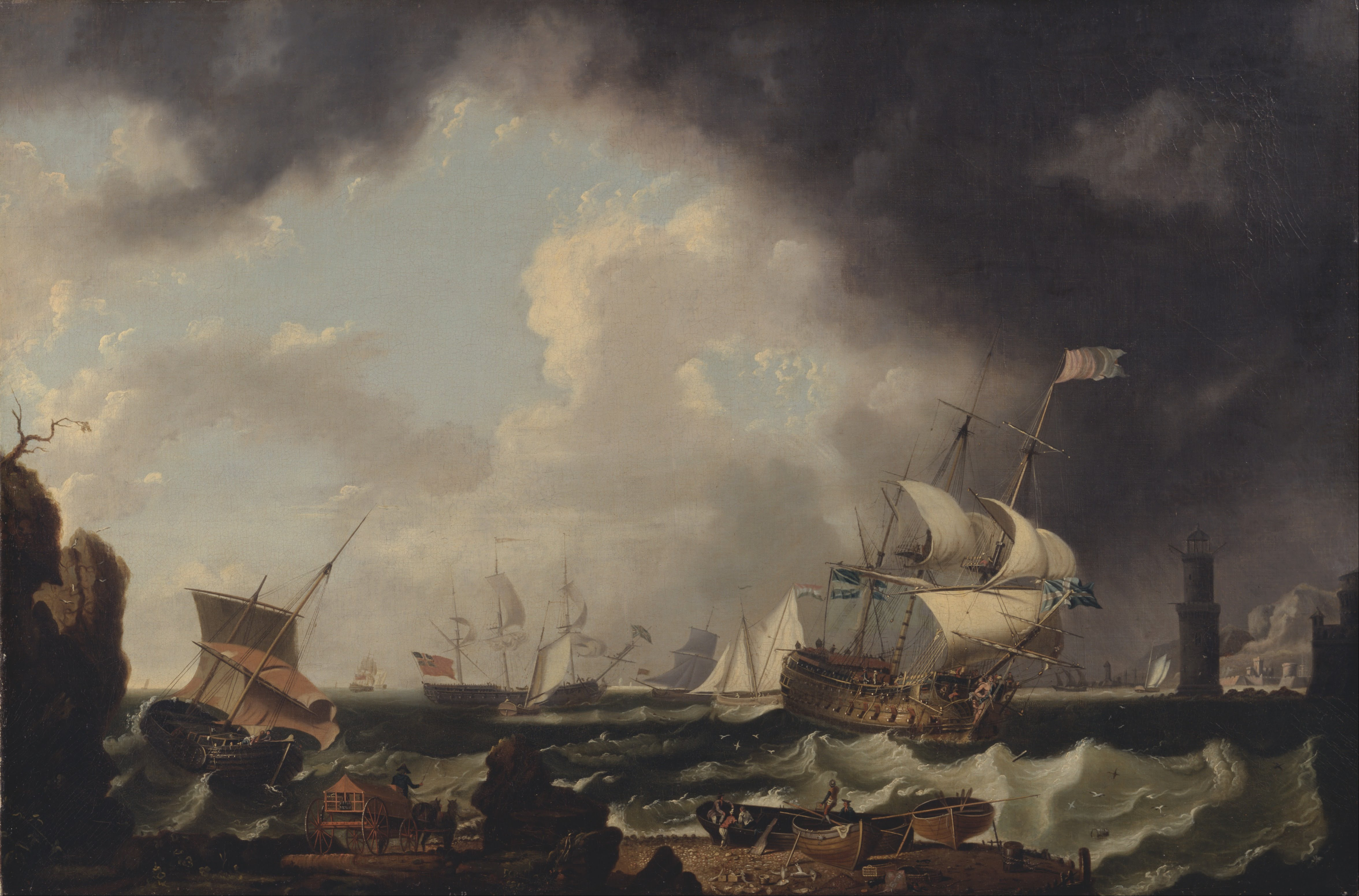
The Fishery (1764)
