= Spanish frigate Hermione =

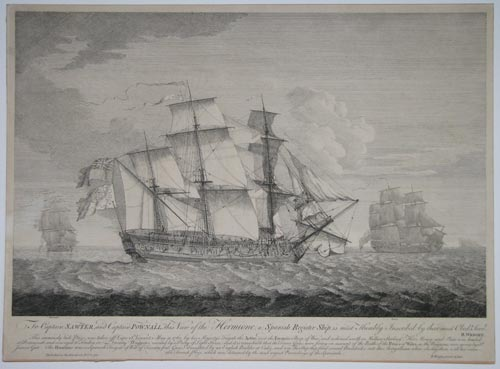
- The British warships Favourite and Active capturing Hermione by Richard Wright

History

Spain
- Name: Hermione
- Home port: Cádiz
- Captured: 31 May 1762

General characteristics
- Type: 26-gun frigate
- Armament: 26 × 9-pounder guns

Hermione was a 26-gun frigate of the Spanish Navy designed by a British shipwright at Cádiz. Opinions differ on the age and provenance of this ship. Some claim it to have been the Hermione bought in 1730. Others believe it to have been the Hermione constructed in the Arsenal de la Carraca, Cádiz in 1752.

== Notable incidents ==
The ship fired several broadsides into the privateer Antigallican when held at Cádiz in 1756 at the beginning of the Seven Years' War, at that time armed with 32 nine-pounders.

Hermione engaged Captain Herbert Sawyer's frigate, the 28-gun HMS Active, and the 18-gun sloop-of-war Favourite under Captain Philemon Pownoll, off the coast of Spain near the port of Cádiz in the action of 31 May 1762. The British captured Hermione, with the capture being notable for the size and value of the bounty seized and the subsequent prize money awarded, possibly the largest ever in a single haul.

William Cole, on a visit to his friend Horace Walpole, noted the suicide of Walpole's neighbour, Isaac Fernandez Nunez, in the summerhouse of Cross Deep House, following Nunez's ruin as insurer of Hermione.

Hermione features in a picture by Richard Wright, dated November 1762, depicting the capture and dedicated to the victorious captains by the artist.

== Bibliography ==
- Winfield, Rif; Tredrea, John M; García-Torralba Pérez, Enrique & Blasco Felip, Manuel (2023). Spanish Warships in the Age of Sail 1700—1860: Design, Construction, Careers and Fates. Seaforth Publishing. ISBN 978-1-5267-9078-1.
