= Sir Thomas Adams, 6th Baronet =

Captain Sir Thomas Adams Bt
- Born: February 1738
- Died: April 1770 (aged 32); Off the North American coast
- Military career
- Allegiance: Great Britain
- Branch: Royal Navy
- Rank: Post-Captain
- Commands: HMS Happy; HMS Terpsichore; HMS Boston; HMS Niger
- Conflicts: Seven Years' War

Sir Thomas Adams, 6th Baronet (bpt. 17 February 1738 – April 1770) was an officer in the Royal Navy who served during the Seven Years' War.

Born into a prominent and long-standing London family, Adams inherited a baronetcy when young, and went on to have a successful career at sea. He was promoted to lieutenant during the Seven Years' War, and within two years was commanding a ship of his own. He was captain of several frigates, and went out to the East Indies with one. He had some success against French and Spanish shipping, capturing privateers, before being sent to Newfoundland after the end of the war. Here he made the acquaintance of Constantine Phipps and the naturalist Joseph Banks, and also met the future explorer James Cook, who was conducting surveys of the Newfoundland coast at the time of Adams' visit.

Adams returned to Britain and was given command of a new ship. He returned to North America with her, but died while in command of her. The baronetcy he had inherited became extinct on his death.

== Family and early life ==
Thomas was baptised in Old St. Pancras Church on 17 February 1738.

Adams was the son of Sir Robert Adams, a solicitor in the city of London, and his second wife, Diana. Thomas was the eldest of two sons by his father's second marriage, having a younger brother named William. The Adams were an important London family, with Thomas' great-grandfather, Sir Thomas Adams, having served as Lord Mayor of London and a member of parliament, for which he was created a baronet. Robert Adams inherited the baronetcy on the death of his elder brother Charles, and when Robert died circa 1754, it passed to his son Thomas. Thomas was baptised on 17 February 1738 at St Pancras Old Church.

Thomas Adams embarked on a naval career, and was commissioned as lieutenant on 8 June 1757, during the Seven Years' War. He was advanced to commander within a few years, taking over the ketch HMS Happy in November 1759. A further promotion followed on 17 August 1760, when he was advanced to post-captain. After this he was appointed to command the 24-gun HMS Terpsichore.

== Command ==
Adams was employed on the home station, cruising against enemy warships and privateers. He had relatively few successes during his time in command, though he did manage to capture the French privateer Brimborion off the Isles of Scilly on 8 August 1761. Brimborion was out of Dieppe, and was armed with one carriage gun and twelve swivel guns and had a crew of 35. She had been cruising for two weeks and had captured two sloops and a snow. Adams carried her into Plymouth. After his arrival there he received orders to sail to the East Indies, departing England on 23 May and returning in July 1762.

Adams was moved from command of Terpsichore shortly after his arrival, and instead appointed to the newly built 32-gun HMS Boston. He commanded her during the blockade of the Basque Roads and on 29 November 1762 he captured the 10-gun Spanish vessel Pacto de Familia. The signing of the Treaty of Paris in February 1763 ended the Seven Years' War and Boston was paid off in March. Adams was not long without a ship, having received an appointment that month to take over the 32-gun HMS Niger. Niger was initially employed off the west coast of Scotland, around the Isle of Arran, in 1764, and it was about this time that Adams appears to have married the Hon. Frances Warter-Wilson in Dublin.

In early 1766 he was ordered to Newfoundland. Also on board for the voyage were Constantine Phipps, and the botanist Joseph Banks, while Adams had James Burney with him as his servant. The purpose of the journey was to transport a party of mariners to Chateau Bay to build a fort, to continue strengthening relations with the native population, and to survey some of the coast of Newfoundland. During his time in Newfoundland Adams met James Cook, who was engaged in surveying the coast, and introduced him to Banks.

== Later life ==
Adams returned to England in 1767 and paid off Niger. He was without a ship until August 1769 when he recommissioned his former command, HMS Boston, which had just completed a refit. He was sent out to North America again. He died in command of Boston while on the Virginia station in April 1770.^{[a]} His will was proven in November 1770, which described him as a bachelor, implying his wife had died. That he died without issue and that his younger brother William had presumably predeceased him, is shown by the fact that the baronetcy became extinct on his death.

== Notes ==
a. Sources disagree on the date of his death. Burke's Genealogical and Heraldic History gives a date of 12 April, while Charnock's Biographia Navalis has 16 April.

== Citations ==
Baronetage of England
Preceded by Robert Adams	Baronet (of London) c.1754–1770	Extinct
