= HMS Active (1758) =

Coventry-class Royal Navy frigate

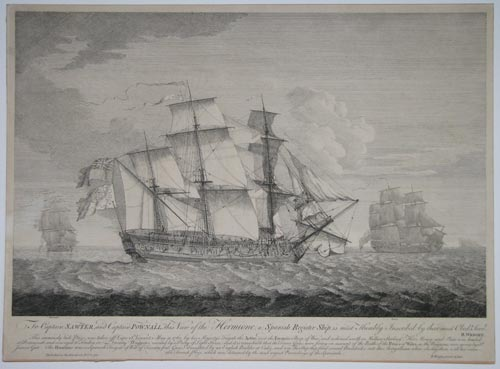
- Active (right) engaging the Spanish frigate Hermione (centre) in 1762: sketch by Richard Wright

History

Great Britain
- Name: HMS Active
- Ordered: 6 May 1757
- Builder: Thomas Stanton, Rotherhithe
- Laid down: 13 June 1757
- Launched: 11 January 1758
- Completed: 2 March 1758 at Deptford Dockyard
- Commissioned: January 1758
- Fate: Taken by the French off San Domingo 1 September 1778

France
- Name: Active
- Acquired: 1778 by capture
- Fate: Broken up 1795

General characteristics
- Class & type: 28-gun Coventry-class sixth-rate frigate
- Displacement: 850 tons (French)
- Tons burthen: 594 87/94 bm
- Length: 118 ft 4 in (36.1 m) (gundeck); 97 ft 5 3/8 in (29.7 m) (keel)
- Beam: 33 ft 10 1/2 in (10.3 m)
- Depth of hold: 10 ft 6 in (3.20 m)
- Sail plan: Full-rigged ship
- Complement: British service: 200 officers and men; French service: 130 (peace) and 210 (war)
- Armament: British service; Upper deck: 24 × 9-pounder guns; QD: 4 × 3-pounder guns; 12 × 1/2-pounder swivel guns; French service (from 1780): Upper deck: 24 × 9-pounder guns; Spar deck: 6 × 4-pounder guns + 6 × 18-pounder carronades (British); French service (from 1793): Upper deck: 24 × 8-pounder guns; Spar deck: 6 × 4-pounder guns

HMS Active was a 28-gun Coventry-class sixth-rate sailing frigate of the Royal Navy, launched in 1758. She was one of the captors of the Spanish ship Hermione. After Hermione surrendered, her captors found that she carried a large cargo of gold and silver that would lead to the greatest single amount of prize money awarded to the crew of a British warship.

On 1 September 1778 the French frigates Charmante and Dédaigneuse captured Active after a storm had dismasted her. The French Navy took Active into service under her existing name. She was broken up in 1795.

== Construction ==
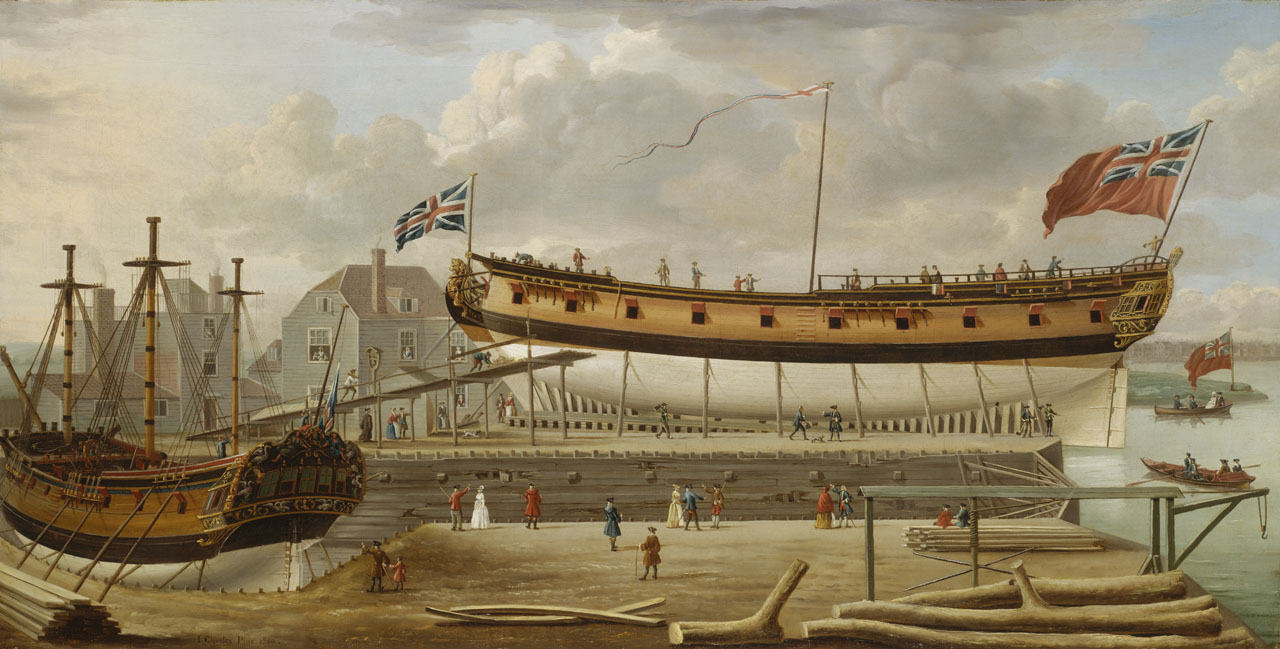
The docks at Rotherhithe, where Active was constructed in 1757–58.

Active was oak-built, one of 18 vessels forming part of the Coventry class of frigates. The naval architect Sir Thomas Slade designed the class to the dimensions of HMS Tartar, which had been launched in 1756 and was responsible for capturing five French privateers in her first twelve months at sea. The Admiralty issued contracts for Active's construction to commercial shipwright Thomas Stanton of Rotherhithe on 23 May 1757, with the stipulation that he complete the work within nine months. Her keel was laid on 13 June 1757 and work proceeded apace, with the new-built vessel launched ahead of schedule on 11 January 1758. As built, Active was 118 ft 4 in (36.1 m) long with a 97 ft 5 in (29.7 m) keel, a beam of 33 ft 10 in (10.31 m), and with a burthen of 59487/94 tons (bm). Construction costs were £6,229, paid on a contract rate of £10 and 12 shillings per ton (bm).

In late February 1758 Active sailed to Deptford Dockyard to receive her guns and naval stores, and to embark her crew of 200 officers and men. Her armament comprised 24 nine-pounder cannons located along her gun deck, supported by four three-pounder cannons on the quarterdeck and twelve ½-pounder swivel guns ranged along her sides.

== British career ==
=== Seven Years' War ===
Active was commissioned in January 1758 under the command of Captain Richard Hughes, entering Navy service during the early stages of the Seven Years' War against France. Her fitout and crewing were completed on 2 March and she put to sea to join a British squadron under Commodore Richard Howe. Howe's orders were to capture or destroy French ports, disable commercial shipping, and divert French land forces from Germany. To this end, between June and September 1758 Active was involved in Navy bombardment and landings at the ports of St Malo and Cherbourg, and was present for the unsuccessful British landings during the Battle of Saint Cast.

Captain Hughes left the vessel in December 1758 and was replaced three months later by Captain Herbert Sawyer. Active then joined Admiral Edward Boscawen's Mediterranean fleet and spent several uneventful months cruising off the French port of Toulon. In mid-1759 Boscawen's fleet put into Gibraltar for repairs, but returned to sea on 17 August when word reached the port that the French were nearby. As part of the fleet, Active played a supporting role in the British victory in the Battle of Lagos on the following day. She returned to England in December 1759, escorting a transport carrying cannons salvaged from wrecked French vessels after the Battle of Quiberon Bay. The voyage was a stormy one, with Active losing her mizzen mast in bad weather off the port of Plymouth.

The frigate next saw action on 31 May 1762, when in company with HMS Favourite she chased down and captured the Spanish treasure ship Hermione off Cape St Mary. Hermione was en route from Lima to Cadiz, carrying a cargo of dollars, gold coin, ingots of gold and silver, cocoa, and blocks of tin. Her crew were unaware that war had been declared between Spain and Britain, and swiftly surrendered when the British ships engaged her. Active, Favourite, and HMS Neptune subsequently escorted Hermione and her cargo to London for remittance to the Crown.

Contemporary accounts estimated the value of Hermione's cargo at £852,000. However, when the ship was condemned as a prize her cargo, hull, and fittings were eventually valued at £519,705 10s 0d, approximately £92.4 million at 2015 prices. This nonetheless represented the single richest capture from any naval action during the Seven Years' War. The captains of Active and Favourite each received £64,872 as prize money – a sum worth approximately £11.5 million at 2015 prices. Ordinary seamen on both ships received £480 each, equivalent to 33 years' wages. (Note: At the time of Hermione's capture an able seaman received £14 8s a year.) One of the crew purchased a gold watch and then melted it in a frying pan for the amusement of his crew mates.

=== Later service ===
In early 1763 as war with France was drawing to a close, the Navy declared Active surplus to requirements and returned her to Deptford Dockyard for decommissioning. After several months in port she returned to sea in August 1763 under Captain Robert Carkett and sailed for the Royal Navy's Jamaica station on 7 October. She remained there for the next four years until, battered by this extensive service in tropical waters, she returned to Sheerness Dockyard where the Navy decommissioned her for a second time.

A survey on 21 February 1770 found Active in poor condition and she was hauled out of the water for major repairs. Works took more than eighteen months at a cost of £9,820 – nearly one third more than her original construction price. Recommissioned in March 1771 under Captain William Peere Williams, she was not finally ready for sea until August. On 22 September 1771 she sailed for the West Indies, and then on to the British Leeward Islands in 1772.

Captain Williams became ill in July 1773. At his request, Admiralty reassigned Active to Newfoundland so that he could recover in what was considered a more healthy climate than that of the Caribbean; but his condition did not improve and on 11 October he transferred to another vessel and returned to England. No new commander was assigned to Active and in 1774 she returned to Portsmouth Dockyard, where she was decommissioned for a third time. After a year at Portsmouth she returned to active service in October 1775 under another Captain William Williams, unrelated to his predecessor. On 12 February 1776 she sailed for the North America station. War with France resumed in February 1777, and Active was transferred back to the Jamaica Station for the protection of British commercial vessels

=== Capture ===
In August 1778 Active was at sea in the Caribbean when a hurricane caught her and dismasted her. The crew had to throw 11 of her guns overboard to lighten her and prevent her capsizing in the storm. On 1 September she encountered the French frigates Charmante and Dédaigneuse off San Domingo as they escorted a convoy from Port au Prince. Williams fired two broadsides and then struck Active's colours. Reportedly, the need to surrender caused Williams to die soon after "of mortification".

== French career and fate ==
The French Navy took Active into service under her existing name. In November 1789 she was on the Martinique station and under the command of capitaine de vaisseau Jean Baptiste Prévost de Sansac, marquis de Traversay. When news of the fall of the Bastille reached the island, French troops there revolted and were sent home. In April 1790 Traversay sailed Active to Lorient as she repatriated troops from Martinique. Active was condemned in November 1794 at Brest and broken up in 1795.
