= Action of 31 May 1762 =

1762 battle of the Anglo-Spanish War

- Part of the Anglo-Spanish War
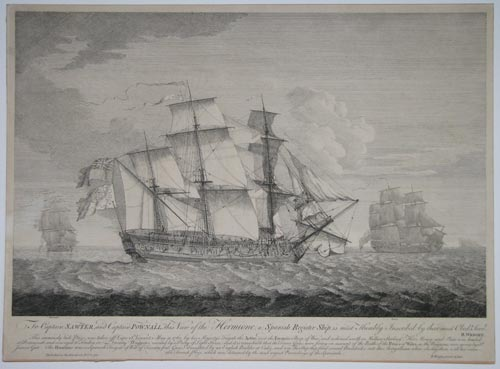
- 1762 engraving of the action
Date	31 May 1762
Location	Off Cádiz, Atlantic Ocean
Result	British victory

Belligerents
Great Britain	Spain

Commanders and leaders
Herbert Sawyer; Philemon Pownoll	Juan de Zabaleta (surrendered)

Strength
1 frigate 1 sloop	1 frigate

Casualties and losses
Unknown	1 frigate captured

The action of 31 May 1762 was a minor naval engagement that took place off the Spanish coast off Cádiz, between the Royal Navy against a Spanish frigate during the recently declared war between Britain and Spain. When the Spanish ship surrendered, it was found that she carried a large cargo of gold and silver that would lead to the greatest amount of prize money awarded to British warships.

== Background ==
The war with Spain was only four months old when the Royal Navy sent a blockading force to the Spanish coast. The blockade aimed to block the dispatch of Spanish reinforcements to the Caribbean where Havana was under British siege, and to impede Spanish operations against Gibraltar or in the Mediterranean.

== Action ==
On 15 May 1762 Captain Herbert Sawyer's frigate, the 28-gun HMS Active, was sailing in company with the 18-gun sloop Favourite, Captain Philemon Pownoll, off the coast of Spain near the port of Cádiz. There they sighted the 26-gun Spanish frigate Hermione.

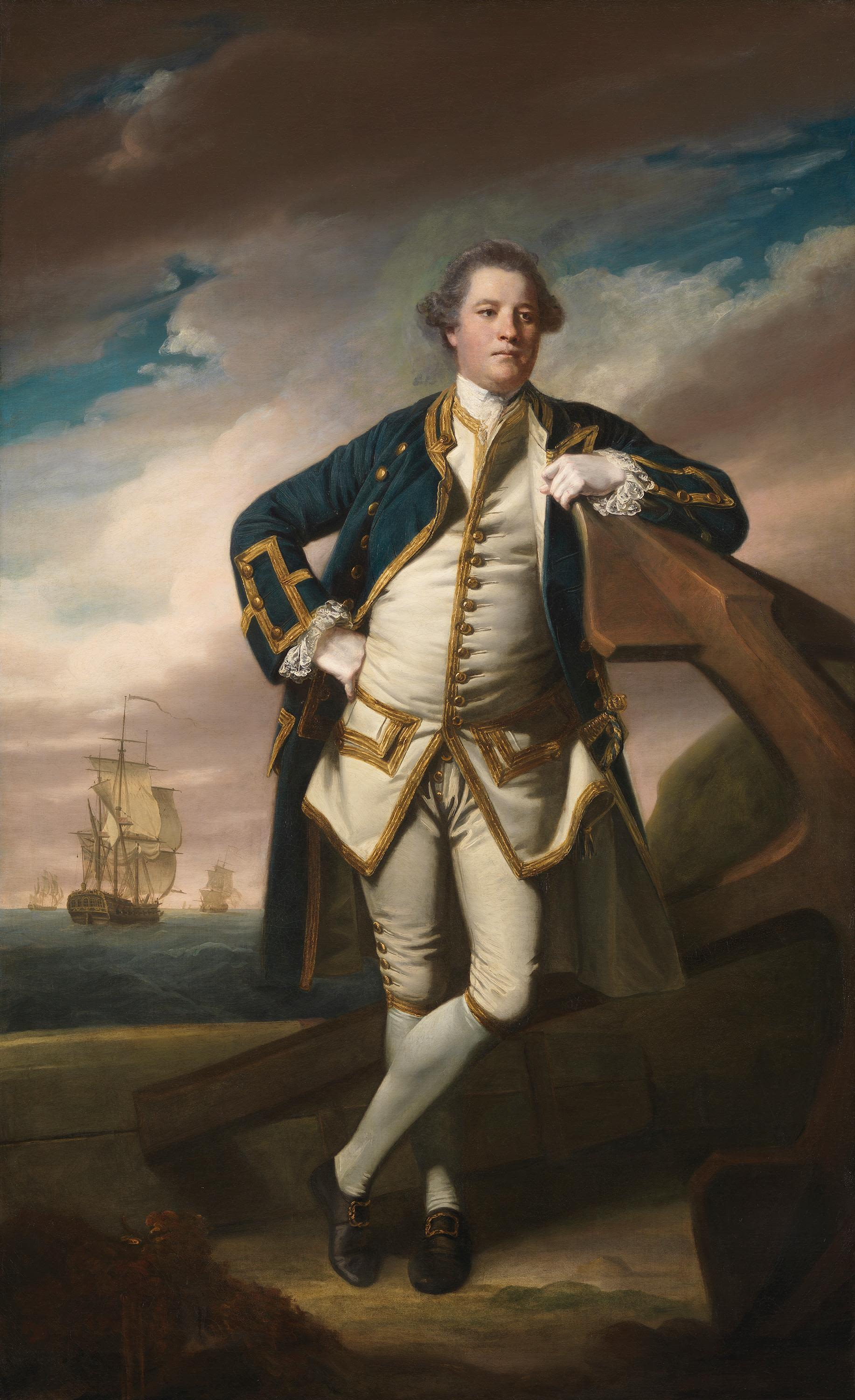
Portrait of Pownoll painted seven years after the action

The Hermione, under Lieutenant Juan de Zabaleta, had sailed from Callao, west of Lima on 6 January 1762, before, and probably ignorant of, the declaration of the Anglo-Spanish War. On sighting the Active and Favourite in the morning, the officers were slow to prepare for battle, only relocating officers and passengers to make way for the gunners by ten o'clock. The guns were not prepared, and the path to the powder magazine was cluttered. At one in the afternoon, the British ships tacked and started to head toward the Hermione. At three o'clock Lieutenant Francisco Javier Morales de los Rios, in charge of the ship's guns, warned Zabaleta to call battle stations who inexplicably responded by refusing to do so until after dinner at five o'clock.

The British vessels came up beside Hermione and fired a few rounds. The Spanish replied with a broadside, and then both Active and Favourite let loose their broadsides. Soon Hermione only had her mizzen mast still standing. As his casualties rose, and having lost the ability to manoeuvre, the Spanish captain struck. There was confusion and misunderstanding between the Spanish officers, and the Hermione only managed two broadsides. When Zabaleta struck his colours, he stated that the British had confused Hermione for a French frigate, though Morales was preparing to continue fire. When the British boarded, Zabaleta surrendered without the agreement of the other officers.

The British soon took possession; only then did they realize this was no ordinary frigate as they discovered the riches on board. Hermione had been bound for Cádiz with a cargo of bags of dollars, gold coin, ingots of gold and silver, cocoa, and blocks of tin. Her captors took Hermione into Gibraltar. She was eventually condemned as a prize, with her contents, hull, and fittings valued at £519,705 10s 0d, approximately £92.4 million at today's prices. Pownoll and Sawyer each received a captain's share of the prize money of £64,872, approximately £11.5 million at today's prices. Ordinary seamen received £480 each, equivalent to thirty years' wages. The prize award is still a record.

== Consequences ==
Sawyer and Pownoll were now suddenly extremely wealthy. Pownoll used his money to buy the Sharpham estate at Ashprington, and to build a large house there designed by Robert Taylor and with gardens designed by Capability Brown. It was about this time that he commissioned a portrait from Sir Joshua Reynolds.

In contrast, on returning to Spain, Zabaleta was tried in a court-martial held aboard Guerrero in the port of Cádiz and sentenced to death. He was later pardoned by Charles III of Spain and instead dismissed from the Spanish navy and imprisoned for ten years despite Zabaleta making an appeal for his release and an offer to fund the construction of a frigate to replace the lost vessel. Morales was suspended for two years, during which he served in xebecs. Another officer of Hermione, Lieutenant Lucas Galves, was suspended for one year.

== See also ==
- Great Britain in the Seven Years' War
