= Adams baronets =

Extinct baronetcy in the Baronetage of England

- Escutcheon of the Adams baronets of London
- Creation date: 1660
- Status: extinct
- Extinction date: 1770

The Adams Baronetcy, of London, was a title in the Baronetage of England. It was created on 13 June 1660 for Thomas Adams, Lord Mayor of London in 1645. The title presumably became extinct on the death of the sixth baronet in 1770.

== Adams baronets, of London (1660) ==
- Sir Thomas Adams, 1st Baronet (c.1586–1668)
- Sir William Adams, 2nd Baronet (1634–1687)
- Sir Thomas Adams, 3rd Baronet (1659–1690)
- Sir Charles Adams, 4th Baronet (c.1665–1726)
- Sir Robert Adams, 5th Baronet (died c.1754)
- Sir Thomas Adams, 6th Baronet (died 1770)

== See also ==
- Adam baronets
