= HMS Happy (1754) =

Sloop of the Royal Navy

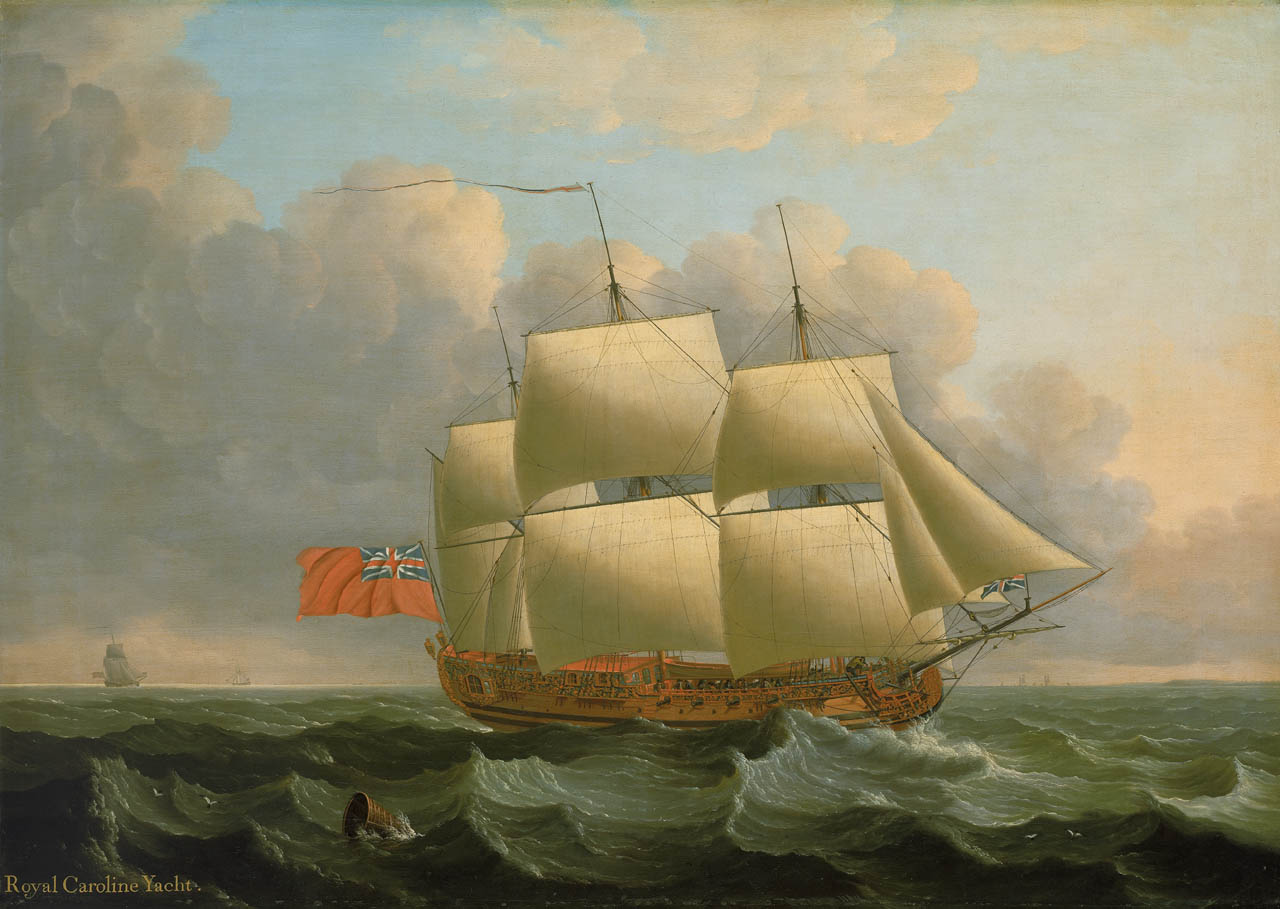
- Happy was designed to resemble the yacht Royal Caroline (pictured).

History

Great Britain
- Name: HMS Happy
- Ordered: 29 August 1753
- Builder: Edward Allin, Woolwich Dockyard
- Laid down: 26 September 1753
- Launched: 22 July 1754
- Completed: 2 September 1754
- Commissioned: July 1754
- In service: 1754–1757; 1758–1762; 1763–1766
- Fate: Wrecked off Winterton-on-Sea, Norfolk 14 September 1766

General characteristics
- Class & type: 8-gun sloop of war
- Tons burthen: 140 79/94 bm
- Length: 75 ft 6 in (23.0 m) (gundeck); 62 ft 3 in (19.0 m) (keel)
- Beam: 20 ft 7.5 in (6.3 m)
- Depth of hold: 9 ft 4 in (2.84 m)
- Sail plan: Ketch rig
- Complement: 50
- Armament: Upperdeck: 8 × 3-pounder guns; 10 × 1/2-pounder swivel guns

HMS Happy was an 8-gun sloop of war of the Royal Navy, launched in 1754 and in active service during the Seven Years' War.

== Construction ==
Happy was one of a group of four similarly sized vessels designed by the Royal Navy to supplement its privateer-hunting capacity in the years following the War of the Austrian Succession. The initial model for her design was the King's yacht Royal Caroline, with modifications drawn from sloops designed by master shipwright Peirson Lock. Compared with Lock's sloops, Happy and her sister ships featured more perpendicular sterns and were less sheer along the sides.

Happy was rigged as a two-masted ketch, with a designated complement of 50 men. She was ordered on 29 August 1753 and her keel laid down at Woolwich Dockyard on 26 September. The half-built vessel was formally named on 26 March 1754, four months before her launch. As built, Happy was 75 ft 6 in (23.0 m) long with a 62 ft 3 in (19.0 m) keel, a 20 ft 7.5 in (6.287 m) beam, and a hold depth of 9 ft 4 in (2.8 m). In keeping with the other vessels in her group, she measured 140 79/94 tons burthen. Construction and fit-out cost £3,304.7s, including provision of 8 three-pounder cannons along her upper deck, supported by ten 1/2-pounder swivel guns ranged along her sides.

== Naval career ==
Happy was commissioned in July 1754 under post-captain Edward Jekyll. Britain had been at peace since the end of the War of the Austrian Succession six years earlier, but the waters around England remained heavily populated with privateers. Happy was therefore assigned to patrol the Bristol Channel in order to protect local merchant craft. In May 1756 Happy's command was transferred to newly promoted post-captain Thomas Burnett. Under Burnett's leadership the vessel made her first capture, seizing Le Renard, a 14-gun French privateer, on 18 February 1757. Burnett left the sloop in May 1757 and was replaced by Commander John Rushworth, who was granted permission to take the vessel cruising along the coasts of England in search of privateers and prize money.

The sloop was formally recommissioned in May 1758, under Commander Herbert Sawyer, in the months preceding the outbreak of the Seven Years' War. In July 1759 she was assigned to support the press gang in rounding up potential naval crews from among the population of Bristol; control of the vessel for this purpose was temporarily granted to Commander Thomas Francis. After six months at this task, Happy was returned to traditional navy duties as a privateer hunter under Commander Sir Thomas Adams. She was surveyed for potential repairs in February 1760, but found to be seaworthy.

In 1761 the vessel was assigned to support the Royal Navy fleet in the roadstead of the Downs, in the North Sea. Her captain for this assignment was Commander Hugh Bromedge; after a year at this station she returned to southern waters to hunt privateers. She was restored to formal duties in April 1763, under Commander Dennis Every, and stationed on patrol at Buchan on the coast of Scotland.

Bromedge was returned to Happy's command in 1764, and remained with her for the next two years. On 14 September 1766 the sloop and her crew were lost when they were caught in severe weather and wrecked off Winterton-on-Sea, in Norfolk.
