= HMY Royal Caroline =

Two royal yachts of the British monarchy have been named HMY Royal Caroline:

- HMY Royal Caroline was originally a 20-gun sixth rate launched in 1700 as HMS Peregrine Galley. She was employed as a royal yacht, and was eventually converted to this role and renamed Carolina in 1716. She was rebuilt in 1733 and renamed Royal Caroline, before reverting to Peregrine Galley in 1749. She foundered in the Atlantic in 1762.
- HMY Royal Caroline (1750) was launched in 1750, renamed HMY Royal Charlotte in 1761, and was broken up in 1820.
