= HMS Neptune (1757) =

Ship of the line of the Royal Navy

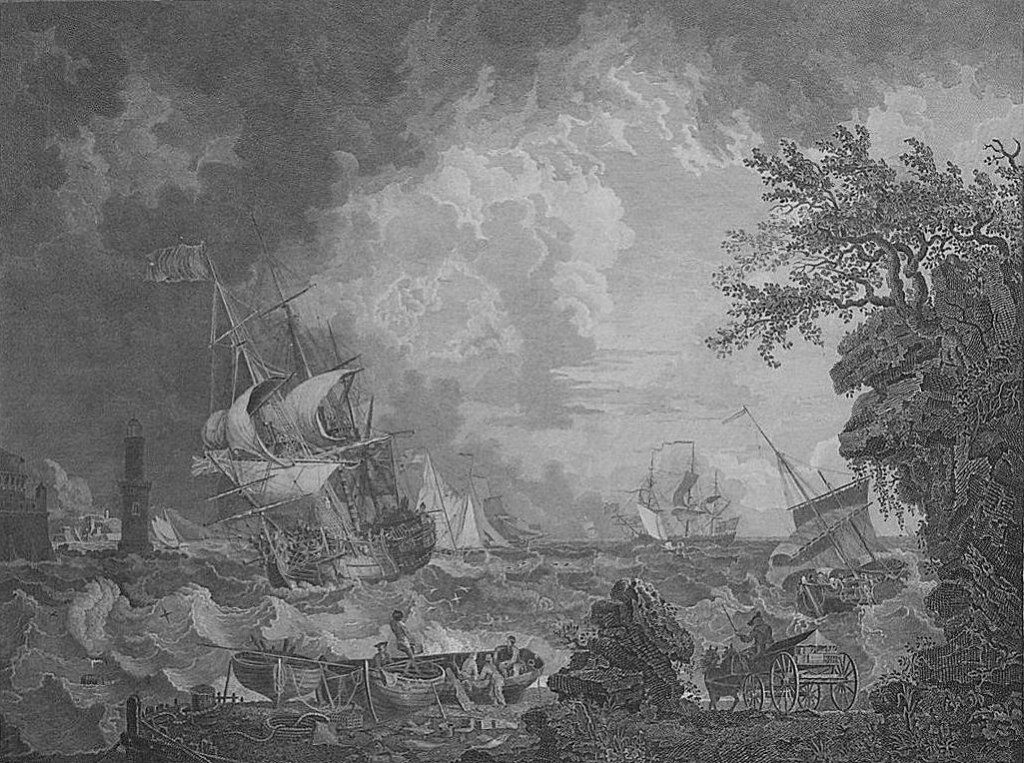
- The Fishery by Woollett after Wright

History

Great Britain
- Name: Neptune
- Ordered: 12 July 1750
- Builder: Portsmouth Dockyard
- Laid down: 20 July 1750
- Launched: 17 July 1757
- Commissioned: November 1756
- Fate: Broken up, 1816

General characteristics
- Class & type: 90-gun second rate ship of the line
- Tons burthen: 1798
- Length: 171 ft (52.1 m) (gundeck)
- Beam: 48 ft 6 in (14.8 m)
- Depth of hold: 20 ft 6 in (6.2 m)
- Propulsion: Sails
- Sail plan: Full-rigged ship
- Armament: 90 guns: Gundeck: 26 × 32 pdrs; Middle gundeck: 26 × 18 pdrs; Upper gundeck: 26 × 12 pdrs; Quarterdeck: 10 × 6 pdrs; Forecastle: 2 × 6 pdrs

HMS Neptune was a 90-gun second rate ship of the line of the Royal Navy, built at Portsmouth Dockyard to the draught specified by the 1745 Establishment as amended in 1750, and launched on 17 July 1757.

Neptune was the flagship for Vice-Admiral Charles Knowles in 1757. One of Neptune's midshipmen at this time was John Hunter, later to become an admiral and the second Governor of New South Wales.

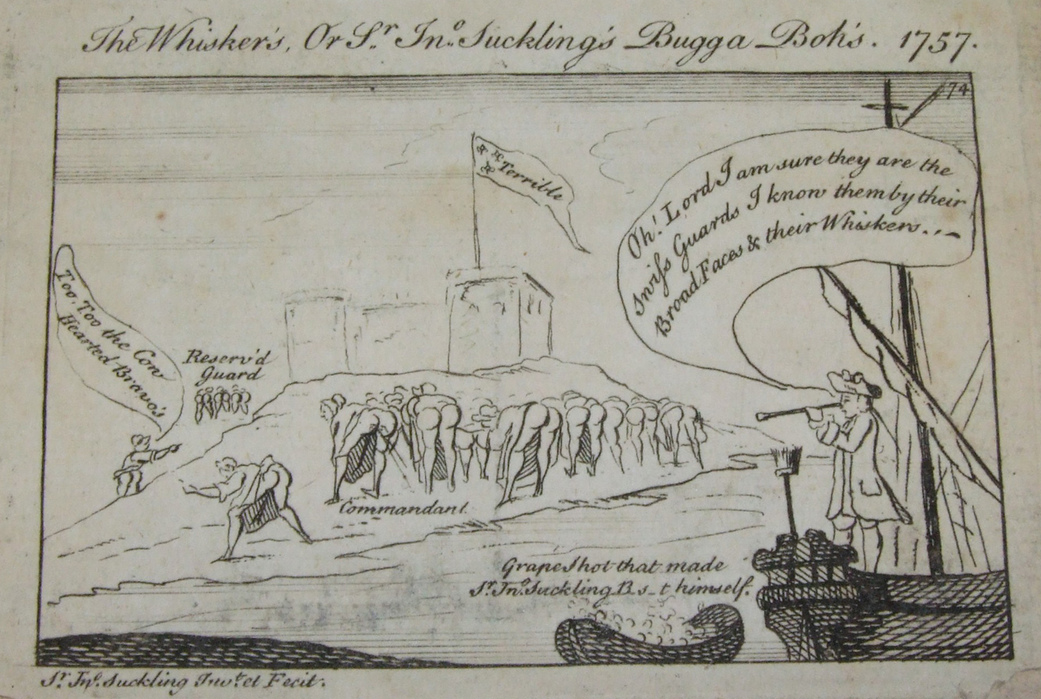
The Whisker's. Or Sr Jn Suckling's Bugga Boh's, a 1757 caricature ridiculing John Mordaunt on the Neptune and the aborted raid on Rochefort in September 1757.

Neptune was converted to serve as a sheer hulk in 1784 and continued in this role until she was broken up in 1816.

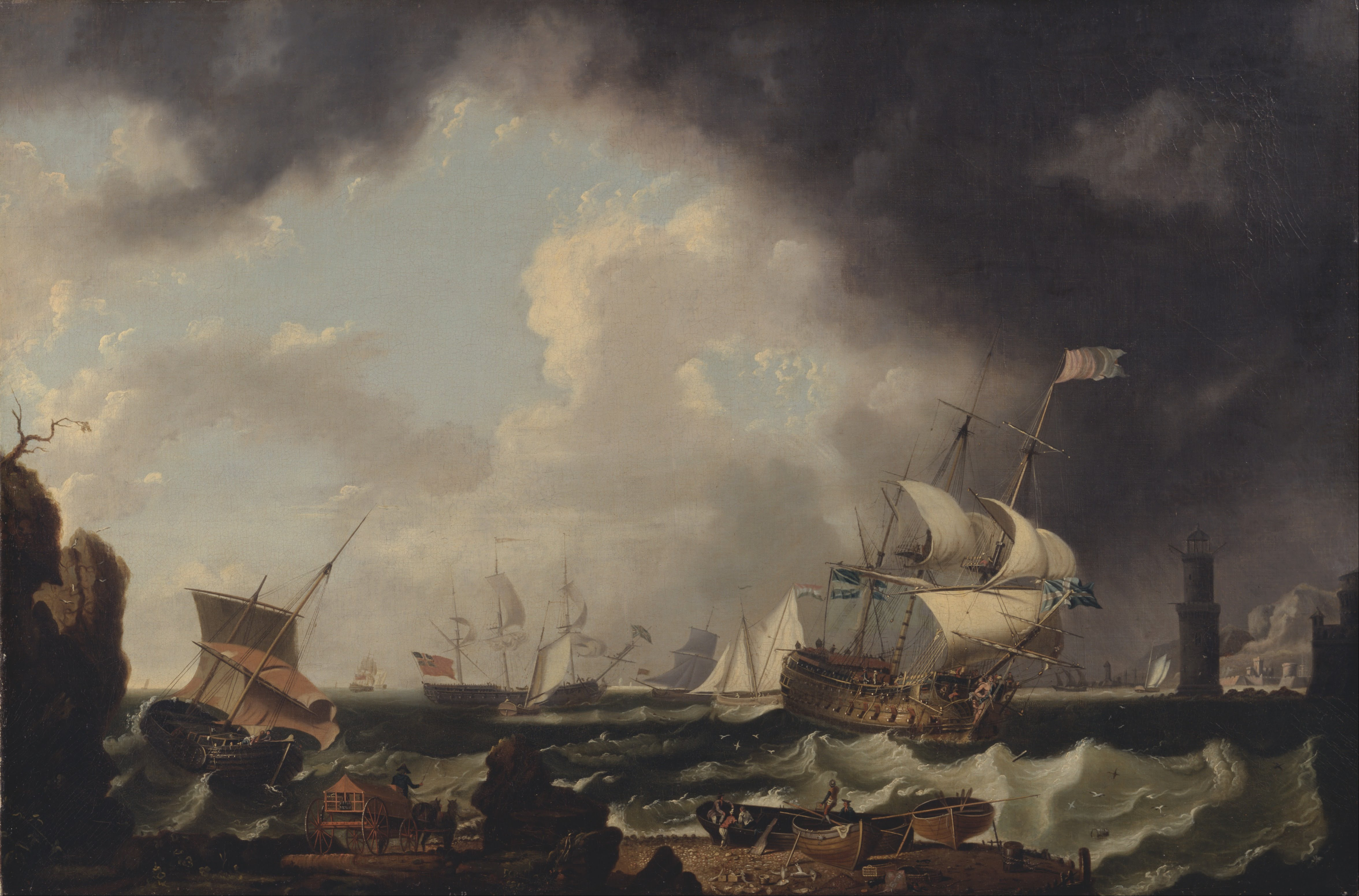
The original version of The Fishery by Richard Wright.

Neptune has been identified as the subject of a 1764 prize-winning painting by Liverpool marine artist Richard Wright, subsequently engraved by William Woollett entitled The Fishery.
