= Herbert Sawyer =

Royal Navy Admiral (fl. 1783–1833)

Admiral Sir Herbert Sawyer KCB
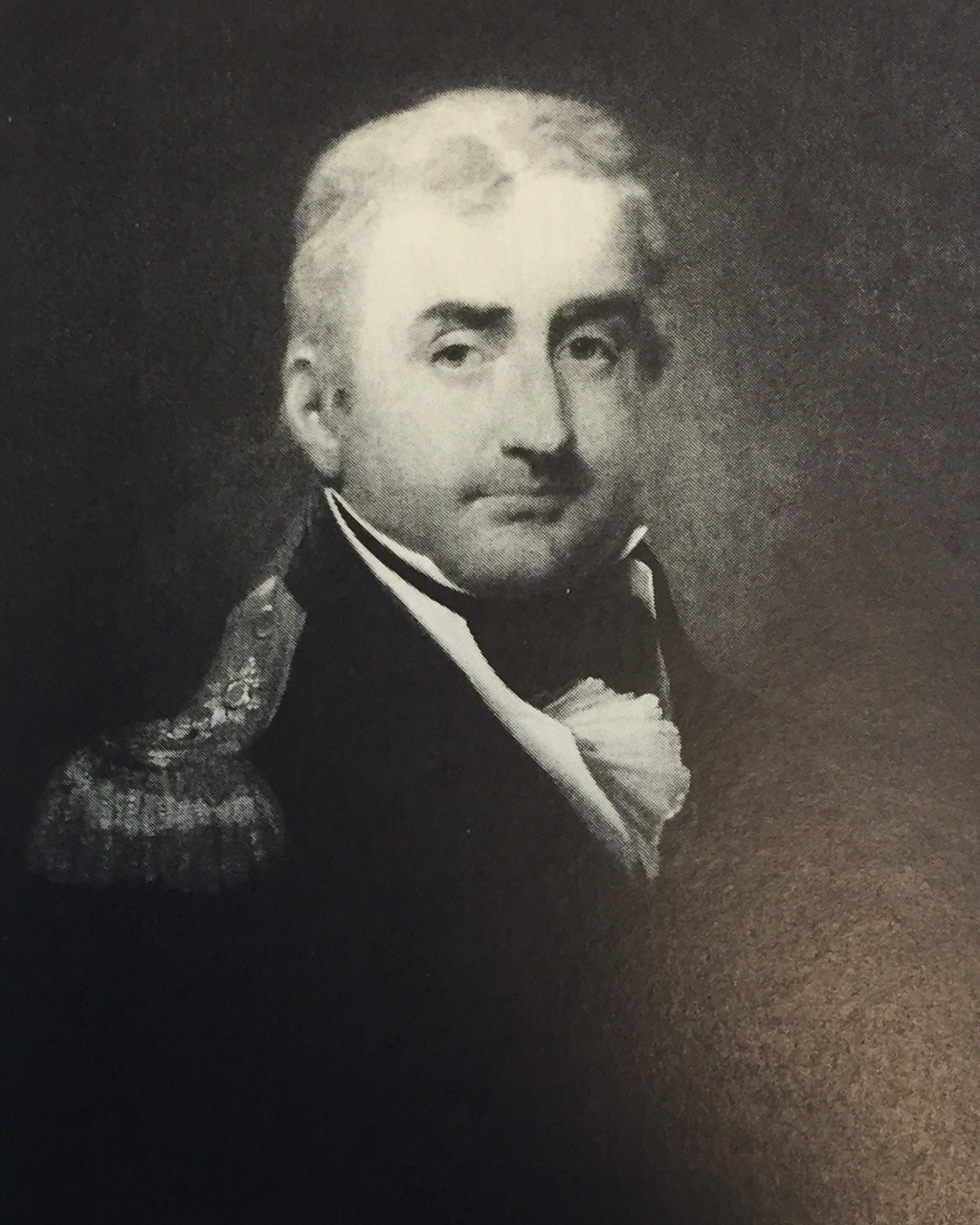
- Herbert Sawyer by Robert Field
- Born: fl. 1783
- Died: 1833 (aged 49–50); Bath, Somerset
- Relatives: Herbert Sawyer (Father)
- Military career
- Allegiance: United Kingdom
- Branch: Royal Navy
- Service years: – 1833
- Rank: Admiral
- Commands: HMS Porcupine; HMS Pegasus; HMS Amphion; HMS Nassau; HMS Saturn; HMS Russell; HMS Juste; North American Station; Cork Station
- Conflicts: Napoleonic Wars
- Awards: Knight Commander of the Order of the Bath

Admiral Sir Herbert Sawyer KCB (fl. 1783–1833) was an officer of the Royal Navy who saw service during the American Revolution, the French Revolutionary War, the War of 1812 and the Napoleonic Wars. He eventually rose to the rank of Admiral.

== Family and early life ==
Sawyer was born the eldest son of Admiral Herbert Sawyer and followed his father into the navy. He saw service during the American Revolution, serving with his father who (by this time) was a captain and commanded a number of ships during the war. By the end of the war, the younger Sawyer was in command of the sloop HMS Porcupine. He was promoted to Post-Captain in 1789 and took command of the 28-gun frigate HMS Pegasus. He served aboard her on the North American Station, operating off Newfoundland. His father was the commander of the base at Halifax during this time.

== Service in the wars ==
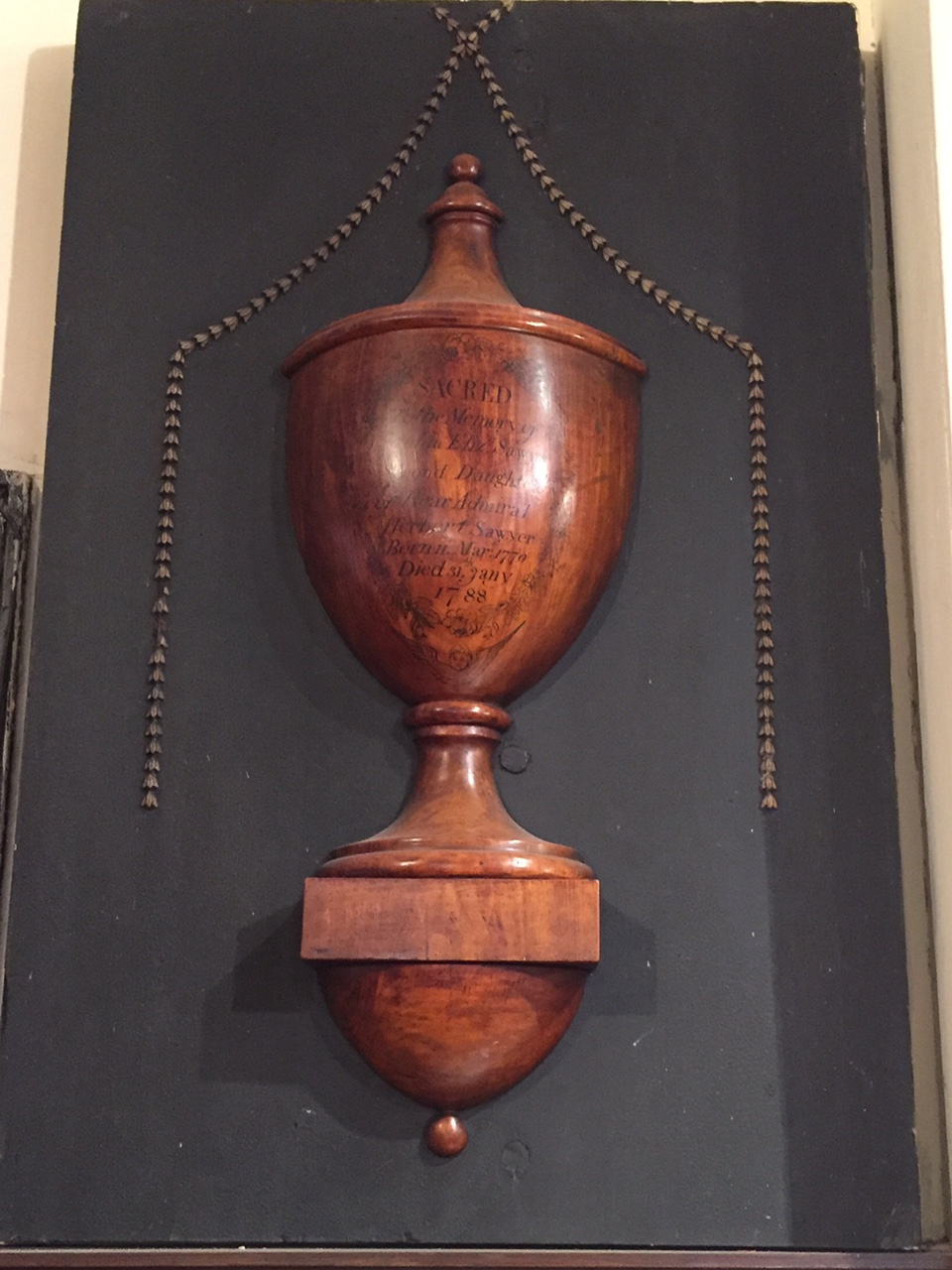
Herbert Sawyer's sister Sophia, d. 1788, St. Paul's Church (Halifax), Nova Scotia

On the outbreak of the war with France in 1793, Sawyer was commander of HMS Amphion, moving to the 64-gun HMS Nassau in 1795. He sailed with Nassau as part of the North Sea Fleet until 1797 when he took command of the 74-gun HMS Saturn. By 1799, he was commander of HMS Russell where he remained until the spring of 1801. He then moved aboard HMS Juste and sailed to the West Indies with Sir Robert Calder's fleet. On Sawyer's return to Britain, he was put in charge of the payment of ships based at Plymouth, a job he held until he was promoted to rear-admiral on 2 October 1807. By early 1810, he was made second-in-command of Portsmouth dockyard and, by the end of the year, was again promoted; this time to the rank of vice-admiral. In 1810 he was appointed to the post of commander-in-chief of the North American Station – his father's old command – which he held during the War of 1812 before relinquishing it in 1813. He then became commander-in-chief of the Cork Station. He became a Knight Commander of the Order of the Bath on 2 January 1815 and was promoted to Admiral of the White in 1825. He died in Bath, Somerset in 1833.

== Notes ==
Military offices
Preceded by Sir John Warren	Commander-in-Chief, North American Station; 1810–1813	Succeeded by Sir John Warren
Preceded by Edward Thornbrough	Commander-in-Chief, Cork Station; 1813–1815	Succeeded by Benjamin Hallowell
