= Herbert Sawyer (Royal Navy officer, died 1798) =

Royal Navy Admiral (c. 1730–1798)

Admiral Herbert Sawyer
- Born: c. 1730
- Died: 4 June 1798; Bath, Somerset
- Relatives: Herbert Sawyer (Son)
- Military career
- Allegiance: Great Britain
- Branch: Royal Navy
- Service years: 1747–1798
- Rank: Admiral
- Commands: HMS Happy; HMS Swallow; HMS Chesterfield; HMS Active; HMS Boyne; HMS Namur; HMS Bombay Castle; North American Station
- Conflicts: Seven Years' War; Louisbourg Expedition; American Revolutionary War; Battle of St. Lucia; Battle of Grenada; Relief of Gibraltar; French Revolutionary Wars

Herbert Sawyer (c. 1730 – 4 June 1798) was an officer of the Royal Navy who saw service during the Seven Years' War, the American War of Independence and the French Revolutionary Wars. He eventually rose to the rank of admiral.

== Early life ==
He was born in 1730, the youngest son of John Sawyer of Hayward, Berkshire by Anne, sister of Anthony Duncombe, Lord Feversham. He entered the navy in 1747, spending his first six years mostly on the Jamaica Station aboard George Townshend's HMS Gloucester. He passed his lieutenant's examination on 30 August 1753, when his age was given as 'more than 22', suggesting he was born in or before 1730. He was promoted to lieutenant on 4 March 1756, and the following year was serving aboard HMS Grafton, which at the time was part of Vice-Admiral Francis Holburne's fleet off Louisbourg.

== Promotion to command ==
He received his first command, that of the sloop HMS Happy on 19 October 1758, but was soon moved to HMS Swallow off the coast of France under the orders of Lord Howe. He took command of HMS Chesterfield on 26 December, followed with a transfer to HMS Active in February 1759. He spent the rest of the war aboard her. On 21 May 1762 he and the sloop HMS Favourite, the latter commanded by Philemon Pownoll, captured the Spanish frigate Hermione off Cádiz. A cargo of over £500,000 in cash and bullion was secured, of which Sawyer received £65,053 13s. 9d. Now extremely wealthy, he married Susannah Ann Majendie, the daughter of a Lisbon merchant. They had a daughter, Ann Sophia, who was the mother of Admiral Sir Henry Hope, K.C.B., and a son, Admiral Sir Herbert Sawyer, K.C.B., who inherited the Leicestershire estates of his father's cousin, the Hon. Frances Bowater, elder daughter and co-heir of Anthony Duncombe, Lord Feversham.

His next appointment came in 1777, with the command of HMS Boyne. He sailed with her the following year to join Rear-Admiral Samuel Barrington off the West Indies, and was present at the repulse of Charles Hector, comte d'Estaing's attempt to capture St Lucia on 15 December that year. Sawyer remained in the Caribbean, and was present at the Battle of Grenada as part of Vice-Admiral John Byron's fleet on 6 July 1779. Sawyer returned to England in the autumn, and was given command of HMS Namur in 1780. He commanded her in the English Channel, and was present at the relief of Gibraltar in April 1781. He left the Namur in December, and by 1783 he was in command of the guardship HMS Bombay Castle at Plymouth.

== On the North American Station ==
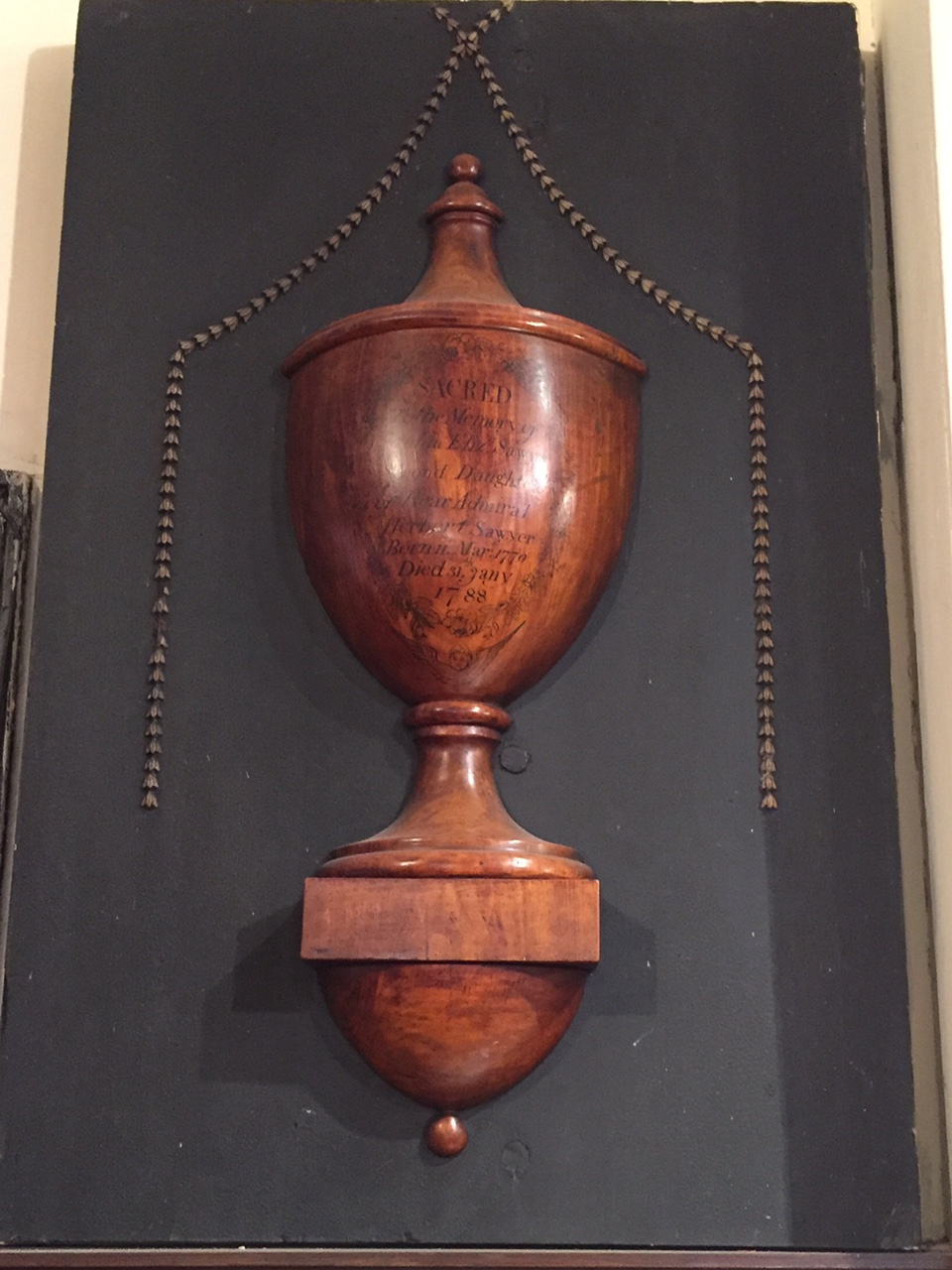
Monument to Herbert Sawyer's daughter Sophia, d.1788 St. Paul's Church (Halifax), Nova Scotia

He left the Namur in 1785 and was appointed commodore of the North American Station's base at Halifax. He took up his post in June, and authorized the frigate HMS Mercury to escort a merchant vessel to the American port of Boston to collect a shipment of cattle. This marked the first free visit of a British warship to the port since March 1776. In 1787 Sawyer had taken part of his fleet to Quebec, where he was embarrassed by a French squadron of three ships of the line and four frigates, which sailed unchallenged along the Nova Scotia coast bound for Boston. His daughter Sophia died in Halifax in 1788 and was buried in the crypt at St. Paul's Church (Halifax). Soon after he returned to England in August 1788.

== Further promotions ==
Sawyer never returned to sea but continued to rise through the ranks based on his seniority. He was promoted to rear-admiral on 24 September 1788, vice-admiral on 1 February 1793 and admiral on 1 June 1795. Poor health meant he was unable to take up any commands. He died in Bath, Somerset, on 4 June 1798. His eldest son, also named Herbert Sawyer followed his father into a navy, and also had served in the American Revolution. He too reached the rank of admiral, and even was appointed to his father's old command on the North American Station, which he commanded during the War of 1812.

== Notes ==
Military offices
Preceded by Sir Charles Douglas	Commander-in-Chief, North American Station; 1785–1789	Succeeded by Sir Richard Hughes
