= Dacres =

Dacres is a surname. Notable people with the surname include:

- Barrington Dacres (died 1806), Royal Navy captain
- Brenda Dacres, British politician
- Desmond Adolphus Dacres, real name of Desmond Dekker (1941–2006), Jamaican singer-songwriter and musician
- James Richard Dacres (Royal Navy officer, born 1749), Royal Navy vice-admiral
- James Richard Dacres (Royal Navy officer, born 1788), Royal Navy vice admiral, son of the former
- Richard Dacres (Royal Navy officer) (1761–1837), Royal Navy vice-admiral
- Richard Dacres (British Army officer) (1799–1886), British Army field-marshal
- Sydney Dacres (1805–1884), Royal Navy admiral and First Naval Lord
- Thomas Dacres (1587–1668), English politician
- Thomas Dacres (younger) (1609–1668), English politician, son of the above

== See also ==
- Dacre (disambiguation)
