= Admiral Dacres =

Admiral Dacres may refer to:

- James Richard Dacres (Royal Navy officer, born 1749) (1749–1810), British Royal Navy vice admiral
- James Richard Dacres (Royal Navy officer, born 1788) (1788–1853), British Royal Navy vice admiral
- Richard Dacres (Royal Navy officer) (1761–1837), British Royal Navy vice admiral
- Sydney Dacres (1804–1884), British Royal Navy admiral
