= Jacques-Aimé Le Saige de La Villèsbrunne =

French Navy officer of the War of American Independence

- Military career
- Allegiance: France
- Branch: Navy
- Rank: Captain
- Commands: Gentille
- Conflicts: War of American Independence

Jacques-Aimé Le Saige de La Villèsbrunne was a French Navy officer. He served in the War of American Independence.

== Biography ==
Le Saige captained the 32-gun frigate Gentille in the Battle of Martinique on 17 April 1780, and in the action of 19 February 1781 where he helped capture HMS Romulus.

Le Saige was then given command of the newly recommissioned Romulus, and took part in the Battle of Cape Henry on 16 March 1781. After the battle, he was promoted to the command of a division composed of the frigates Gentille, Diligente, Aigrette, Iris and Richemond. In September 1781, she ferried Vioménil's troops to Williamsburg for the Siege of Yorktown.

After the Franco-American victory at Yorktown, De Grasse left Le Saige to patrol the Chesapeake with Romulus, Hermione and Diligente.

He was a member of the Society of the Cincinnati.

== Sources and references ==
Notes

Citations

Bibliography

- Contenson, Ludovic (1934). La Société des Cincinnati de France et la guerre d'Amérique (1778-1783). Paris: éditions Auguste Picard. OCLC 7842336.
- Gardiner, Asa Bird (1905). The order of the Cincinnati in France. The Rhode Island state society of Cincinnati. OCLC 5104049.
