= Richard Dacres =

Richard Dacres may refer to:

- Richard Dacres (Royal Navy officer) (1761–1837), Royal Navy vice-admiral
- Richard Dacres (British Army officer), (1799–1886), British Army field marshal
