= French ship Romulus (1781) =

Ship of the French Navy

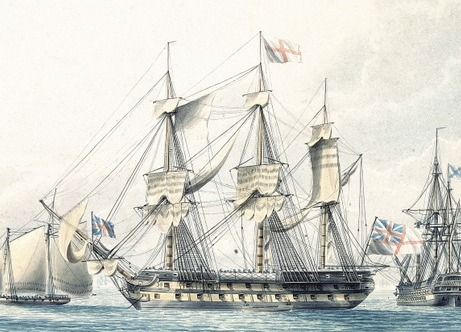
- Romulus's sister ship HMS Argo

History

Great Britain
- Name: Romulus
- Ordered: 14 May 1776
- Builder: Henry Adams, Buckler's Hard
- Laid down: July 1776
- Launched: 17 December 1777
- Completed: 7 April 1778
- Commissioned: December 1777
- Captured: 19 February 1781

History

France
- Name: Romulus
- Acquired: 19 February 1781
- Renamed: Résolution April 1785; Reine January 1787; Résolution March 1787
- Fate: Hulked June 1789

General characteristics
- Class & type: Roebuck-class fifth rate
- Tons burthen: 884 76/94 (bm)
- Length: 140 ft (42.7 m) (gundeck); 115 ft 8 1/2 in (35.3 m) (keel)
- Beam: 37 ft 11 in (11.6 m)
- Draught: 16 ft (4.9 m)
- Depth of hold: 16 ft 4 in (5 m)
- Sail plan: Full-rigged ship
- Complement: 300 (Britain); 400 (France)
- Armament: Lower deck: 20 × 18-pounder guns; Upper deck: 22 × 9-pounder guns; Forecastle: 2 × 6-pounder guns

Romulus was a 44-gun fifth-rate Roebuck-class ship. Initially in service with the Royal Navy, the ship served in North America during the American Revolutionary War. She participated in the siege of Charleston in mid-1780, being one of the ships that navigated over Charleston Bar to threaten the town from the sea before its surrender. Romulus was captured by a French squadron in Chesapeake Bay on 19 February 1781 while escorting a convoy to Portsmouth, North Carolina.

Romulus was taken into service by the French Navy under the same name, and fought at the battle of Cape Henry on 16 March 1781 where she was the rearmost ship in the French line of battle. The ship spent the rest of the war patrolling Chesapeake Bay and escorting troopships. Romulus was renamed Résolution in April 1785 and sailed to the East Indies under Antoine Bruni d'Entrecasteaux. Having briefly been under the name Reine, Résolution was based at Isle de France in 1787. Subsequently damaged by a cyclone, she was decommissioned in December 1788 and returned to Isle de France in the following year to serve as a hulk.

== Design ==
Romulus was originally a British 44-gun, 18-pounder Roebuck-class ship. The class was a revival of the design used to construct the fifth-rate HMS Roebuck in 1769, by Sir Thomas Slade. The ships, while classified as fifth-rates, were not frigates because they carried two gun decks, of which a frigate would have only one. Roebuck was designed as such to provide the extra firepower a ship of two decks could bring to warfare but with a much lower draught and smaller profile. From 1751 to 1776 only two ships of this type were built for the Royal Navy because it was felt that they were anachronistic, with the lower (and more heavily armed) deck of guns being so low as to be unusable in anything but the calmest of waters. (Note: This problem was demonstrated in a sister ship of Romulus, HMS Argo, which two French frigates captured in 1783 because the weather was so bad she was not able to open her lower gun ports during the battle.) In the 1750s the cruising role of the 44-gun two deck ship was taken over by new 32- and 36-gun frigates, leaving the type almost completely obsolete.

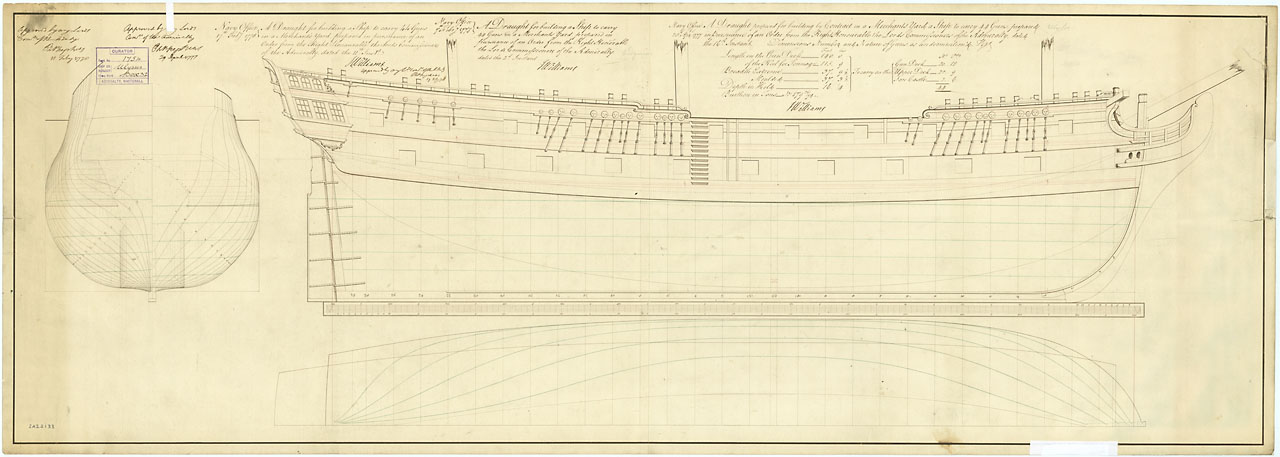
Plan of the Roebuck-class ships

When the American Revolutionary War began in 1775 a need was found for heavily armed ships that could fight in the shallow coastal waters of North America, where two-decked third-rates could not safely sail, and so the Roebuck class of nineteen ships, alongside the similar Adventure class, was ordered to the specifications of the original ships to fill this need. The frigate classes that had overtaken the 44-gun ship as the preferred design for cruisers were at this point still mostly armed with 9- and 12-pounder guns, and it was expected that the class's heavier 18-pounders would provide them with an advantage over these vessels. Frigates with larger armaments would go on to be built by the Royal Navy later on in the American Revolutionary War, but these ships were highly expensive and so Romulus and her brethren continued to be built as a cheaper alternative.

== Construction ==
Romulus, as the second ship built to the design, closely followed the parameters as originally set out for Roebuck in 1769 while later ships of the class differed from the design. While Romulus and the other early ships of the class had two levels of stern windows, there was only ever one level of cabins behind them.

All but one ship of the class were contracted out to civilian dockyards for construction, and the contract for Romulus was given to Henry Adams at Buckler's Hard. The ship was ordered on 14 May 1776, laid down in July the same year and launched on 17 December 1777 with the following dimensions: 140 feet (42.7 m) along the gun deck, 115 feet 8 1/2 inches (35.3 m) at the keel, with a beam of 37 feet 11 inches (11.6 m) and a depth in the hold of 16 feet 4 inches (5 m). Her draught, which made the class so valued in the American Revolutionary War, was 16 feet (4.9 m). She measured 884 76/94 tons burthen. The fitting out process for Romulus was completed on 7 April 1778 at Portsmouth Dockyard. Her construction and fitting out cost in total £15,404.

Romulus received an armament of twenty 18-pounder long guns on her lower deck, with twenty-two 9-pounders on the upper deck. These were complemented by two 6-pounders on the forecastle; the quarterdeck was unarmed. The ship was to have a crew of 280 men, which was increased to 300 in 1783. She was named on 27 August 1776 after the legendary founder of Rome, Romulus.

== British service ==
=== Siege of Charleston ===
Romulus was commissioned by Captain George Gayton in December 1777. The ship sailed to the Mediterranean Sea on 14 June 1778, and then towards the end of the year was transferred to North America. Romulus formed part of the squadron of Vice-Admiral Mariot Arbuthnot which in December was at New York. On 25 December the ship left as part of the escort to the British Army sailing to Savannah, Georgia, as part of preparations for the siege of Charleston. Romulus conveyed the commander-in-chief, Lieutenant-General Sir Henry Clinton, and his staff. Caught in the Gulf Stream, a rough passage meant that the ships only began to arrive at Tybee Island, Georgia in January 1779, coming together again by 2 February.

Clinton planned for the army to advance north towards Charleston with support from the navy, which would bombard the city and its naval forces. Charleston Harbor was notoriously shallow and mud-filled, and naturally protected by the sandbank Charleston Bar. Sailing into Charleston required going over the bar, but even at its lowest point only a small ship such as a sloop of war could safely navigate it. Acknowledging that his larger ships of the line would be incapable of reaching Charleston, Arbuthnot allocated Romulus, Roebuck, the 50-gun HMS Renown, and his smaller vessels to the operation.

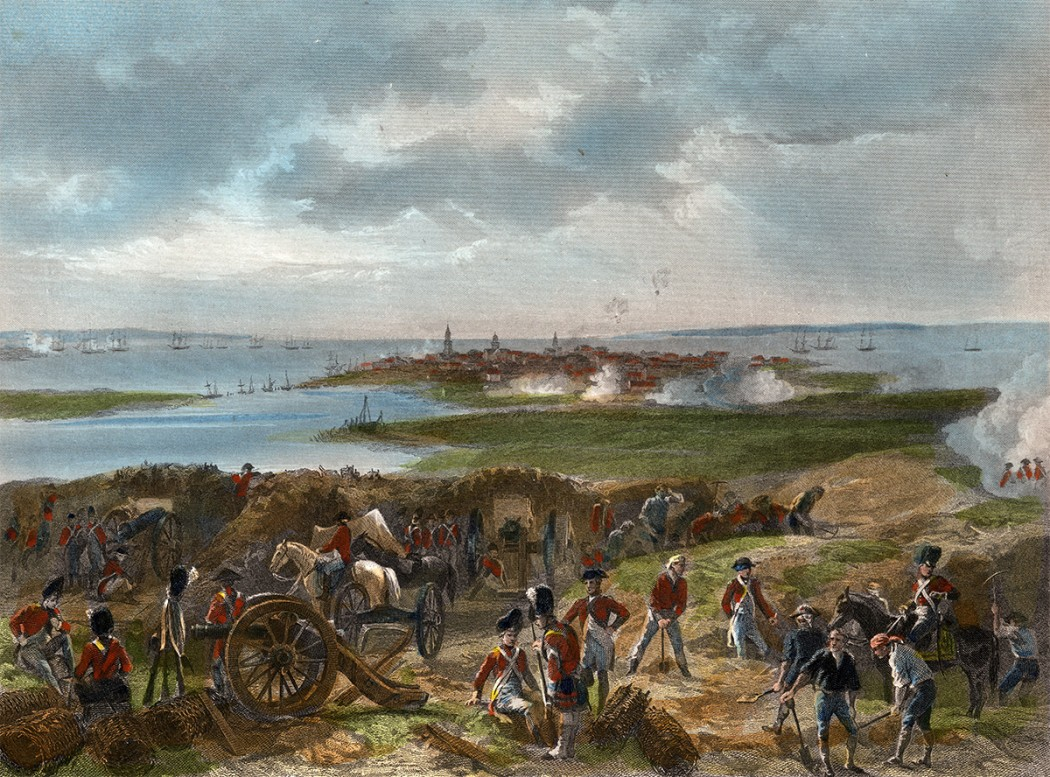
The siege of Charleston; British ships can be seen beyond the town

Roebuck and the two other large vessels assigned to the siege spent March lightening ship, in order to lessen their draught and be able to pass Charleston Bar. Guns, water casks, and stores were transhipped, making the ships rise out of the water to the point that their copper sheathing could be seen. When this had been completed the wind turned against Arbuthnot's ships, forcing him to wait until 20 March to start the operation. Roebuck, as flagship, led the ships in, and by the end of the day all had made it over the bar. The guns and stores that had been removed were then returned to the vessels by the squadron's small boats. The ships then positioned themselves in the outer harbour. The siege officially began on 29 March.

The squadron sailed to breach Charleston harbour on 8 April, having to navigate a channel guarded by Fort Moultrie on Sullivan's Island to reach it. The fort opened fire on the advancing ships, which were forced by the sandbanks to sail close to it. Over a period of two hours the British vessels sailed up to Fort Moultrie one by one and fired their broadside into it, Renown at the rear of the line finally silencing the American guns. Romulus was not damaged during her passage. The ships then reached James Island, just outside the range of the main Charleston defences. The advance cost them twenty-seven men killed or wounded. On 10 May news came to the British that a French squadron under Chef d'escadre Charles-Henri-Louis d'Arsac de Ternay was sailing to North America, and Arbuthnot's force was required at New York to defend against it. Charleston surrendered two days later.

In order to return to the open sea, Charleston Bar had to be navigated once again. The ships completed the lightening process and traversed the bar in early June. Arbuthnot sailed for New York with much of Clinton's army, the commander-in-chief again on Romulus, on 9 June and arrived at Sandy Hook ten days later.

=== Capture in the Chesapeake ===
Romulus was next used as lead escort to a force of troopships under the command of Brigadier-General Alexander Leslie, which sailed from New York on 17 October 1780. Intended to disrupt the American lines of communication behind Lieutenant-General Lord Cornwallis's army operating in North Carolina, Leslie's force was landed at Portsmouth, North Carolina, on 19 October. Romulus supported further landings at Newport News and Hampton on 22 October.

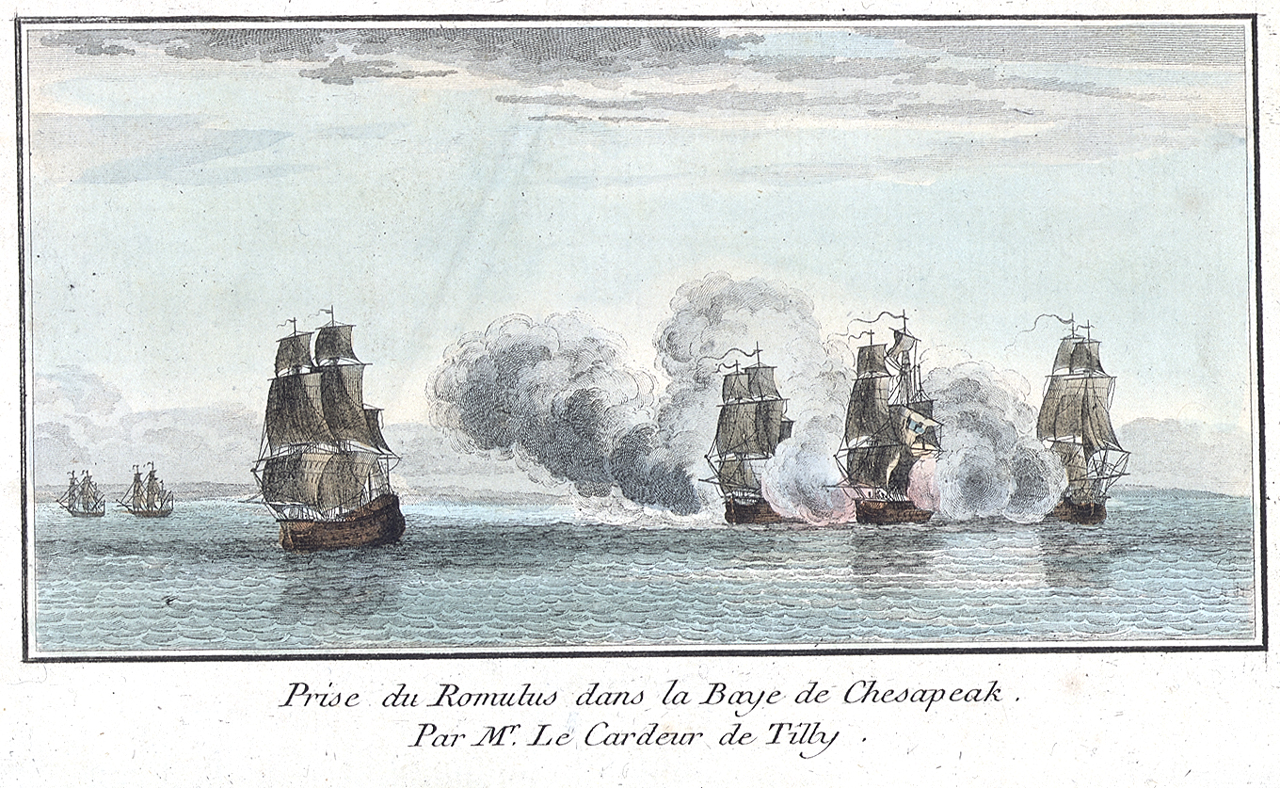
Romulus is captured on 19 February 1781

The French force under Ternay subsequently based itself at Rhode Island, watched by a British squadron; upon the death of Ternay it had been taken over by Captain Charles Sochet-Destouches. In early February 1781 Sochet-Destouches used the cover of a storm to send the 64-gun ship of the line Éveillé and 32-gun frigates Surveillante and Gentille out of Narragansett Bay and into Chesapeake Bay, tasked with attacking the British Army in Virginia. They were under the command of Captain Armand Le Gardeur de Tilly. At the same time Romulus was responding to an order sent to her several weeks previously by Arbuthnot, to replace her sister ship HMS Charon in support of the land force at Portsmouth. Travelling up from Charleston on 19 February and escorting ten transport ships, Romulus met Éveillé and her consorts, now including the cutter Guêpe, as they were sailing out of the Chesapeake.

Romulus approached the French ships, which were initially at anchor, in the belief that they were British as Gayton had not been informed of their escape from Rhode Island. When the French ships failed to respond to his signals, Gayton cleared for action and began to sail away from the superior force. Romulus manoeuvred poorly and was fired on by the French chase guns. Gentille and Surveillante soon caught up with Romulus and were able to station themselves on either side of her. The ships did not fire any further, and when Éveillé also drew near to Romulus, Gayton surrendered. Romulus was taken with the French on their return journey to Newport, Rhode Island, and the transports, also captured, were sent to Philadelphia.

== French service ==
=== Battle of Cape Henry ===
Romulus was taken into service with the French Navy under the same name, remaining in the squadron of Sochet-Destouches, under the command of Captain Jacques-Aimé Le Saige de La Villèsbrunne. The crew was increased to 400 men. On 8 March Sochet-Destouches sailed from Long Island to the Chesapeake with seven ships of the line and Romulus, conveying an army commanded by Lieutenant-General Jean-Baptiste de Rochambeau. Arbuthnot sailed with his eight ships of the line to intercept Sochet-Destouches. At dawn on 16 March the British located the French fleet, finding that they had in fact overtaken them about 100 miles (160 km) northeast of the Chesapeake. Sochet-Destouches had been sailing southwest towards the Chesapeake, but upon meeting with Arbuthnot's ships, he reversed his fleet's course.

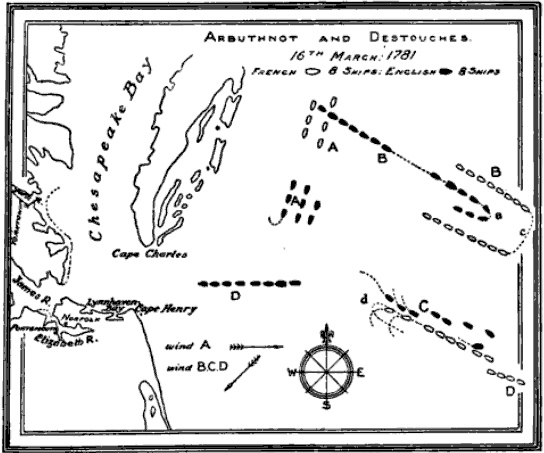
Map showing the fleet movements at the battle of Cape Henry

The British formed line of battle as they chased the French. Unable to out-sail Arbuthnot, at 9:20 a.m. Sochet-Destouches ordered his line around to face the British. Romulus, bringing up the rear of the French line just behind her captor Éveillé, was the last to make the turn. With the two lines of battle heading towards each other, the British attempted to cross the T in front of the French line; to avoid this at 11:15 a.m. Sochet-Destouches had his line turn away from Cape Henry and out to sea, which forced Arbuthnot to change his course to avoid the French crossing his T instead. The two fleets were now sailing in parallel, with the British behind the French. By 1:00 p.m. the leading British ship, the 74-gun ship of the line HMS Robust, was coming in range of Romulus, still in the rear of the French line.

The British continued to close on the French, until at 1:30 p.m. Sochet-Destouches reversed his line once more, turning so that they were now advancing on the starboard side of Robust. Arbuthnot, fearing any further manoeuvring would allow the French to reach the Chesapeake, had his ships mirror the French turn so that they were again parallel, beginning the battle of Cape Henry. Confusion amongst the leading British ships led them to sail out of the line of battle and directly towards their opposite numbers, creating a chaotic skirmish. The rearmost ships continued to heed Arbuthnot's order to form line of battle, not directly engaging their opposite numbers in the French line.

The battle continued until about 3:00 p.m. when Sochet-Destouches ordered his ships to disengage. Reversing the line of battle to head southeast, Romulus now led the force. Arbuthnot's ships had badly damaged rigging and were unable to chase; the 90-gun ship of the line HMS London fired a parting broadside at Romulus as she passed by, but missed. Romulus had one soldier and several sailors killed in the battle. The French then remained at Rhode Island, awaiting reinforcements from Lieutenant-General of the Navy François Joseph Paul de Grasse, and in about August Sochet-Destouches was replaced by Commodore Jacques-Melchior Saint-Laurent, Comte de Barras.

=== Later service ===
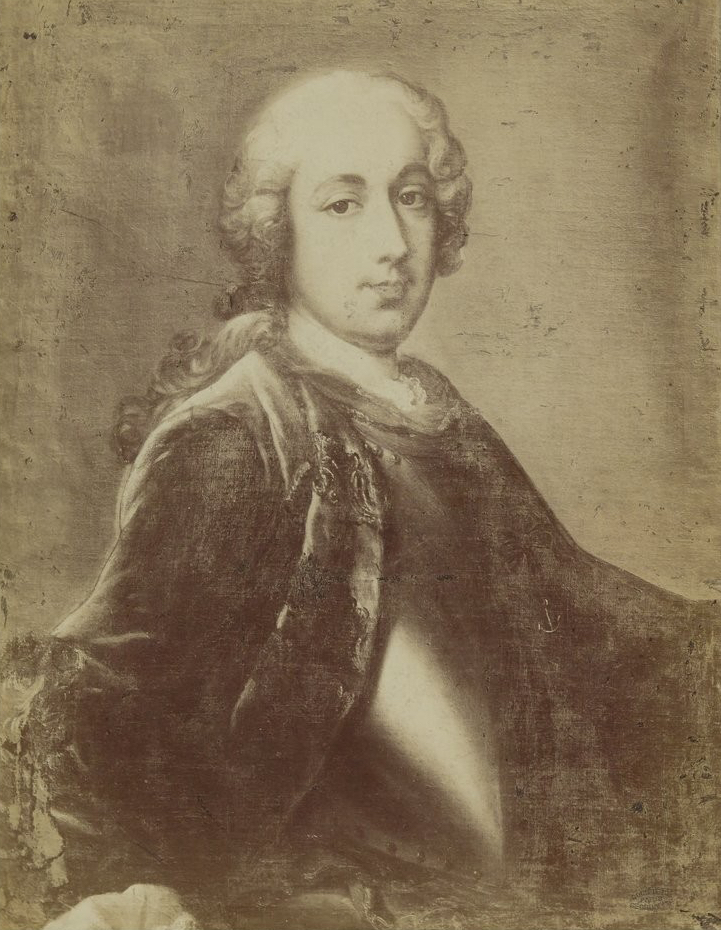
Antoine Bruni d'Entrecasteaux commanded Résolution in the East Indies

The French avoided major offensive operations at sea through this period; in September Romulus ferried troops under Maréchal de camp Charles du Houx, Marquis of Vioménil, to Annapolis to participate in the siege of Yorktown, as part of a squadron under Villèsbrunne. After the siege was won in October, Romulus patrolled the York and James Rivers alongside the 32-gun frigate Hermione and 26-gun frigate Diligente, based at Yorktown.

The American Revolutionary War coming to an end, by 17 June 1783 Romulus was at Brest, France, serving as an escort to troopships. She was converted into a frigate in 1784 and then renamed Résolution in April 1785. In the following year she was sent to the East Indies in a squadron also including the 24-gun corvette Subtile, commanded by Captain Antoine Bruni d'Entrecasteaux. Sailing from Brest on 13 May 1785, they arrived at Isle de France on 22 September. The squadron left the island on 20 October and proceeded to navigate a new route through the East Indies to Canton in China, sailing through the Sunda Strait, Maluku Islands, and then east of the Philippines. In January 1787 Résolution was briefly renamed Reine, before returning to Résolution in March.

The ships arrived at Macao on 7 February 1787 searching for the French explorer Jean-François de Galaup, comte de Lapérouse, but missed him by two days. d'Entrecasteaux was subsequently appointed governor of Isle de France and Île Bourbon, and Résolution arrived there on 25 October. The ship subsequently returned to France and was decommissioned at Brest in December 1788 having been damaged by a cyclone. Taken out of service, the ship was hulked at Isle de France in June 1789.
