= Dacor =

Dacor and similar may refer to:

- Dacor (scuba diving), a former manufacturer of gear for scuba diving
- Dacor (kitchen appliances), a United States–based kitchen appliance maker
- Diplomatic and Consular Officers Retired, an organization based at the Ringgold-Carroll House, in Washington, DC, in the United States

== See also ==
- Dacre (disambiguation)
- Dakor, a town and a municipality in Kheda district in the state of Gujarat, India
- Dacorum (disambiguation)
