= French frigate Gentille =

French frigate Gentille may refer to the following ships:

- French frigate Gentille (1689)
- French frigate Gentille (1702)
- French frigate Gentille (1778)
