= Sydney Dacres =

Royal Navy Admiral (1804-1884)

Admiral Sir Sydney Dacres GCB
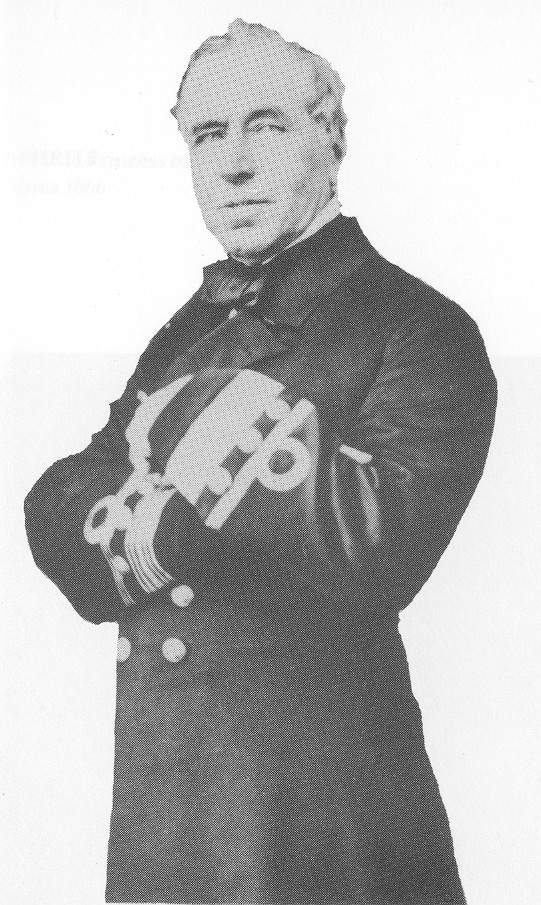
- Admiral Sir Sydney Dacres
- Born: 9 January 1804; Totnes, Devon, England
- Died: 8 March 1884 (aged 80); Steyning, Sussex
- Relatives: Richard Dacres (father); Sir Richard James Dacres (brother); James Richard Dacres (uncle); Barrington Dacres (cousin); James Richard Dacres (cousin)
- Military career
- Allegiance: United Kingdom
- Branch: Royal Navy
- Service years: 1817–1874
- Rank: Admiral
- Commands: HMS Salamander; HMS St Vincent; HMS Leander; HMS Sans Pareil
- Conflicts: Crimean War
- Awards: Officier of the Legion of Honour; Knight Grand Cross of the Order of the Bath

Admiral Sir Sydney Colpoys Dacres, GCB (spelt Sidney in many sources; 9 January 1804 – 8 March 1884) was an officer of the Royal Navy who saw service during the Greek War of Independence, when he was involved in an attack on the Turkish forces at Morea, and later during the Crimean War. Born into a substantial naval dynasty during the Napoleonic Wars, he eventually rose to the rank of Admiral and became First Naval Lord. His only significant action as First Naval Lord was to press for the abolition of masts. He went on to be Visitor and Governor of Greenwich Hospital.

== Early career ==
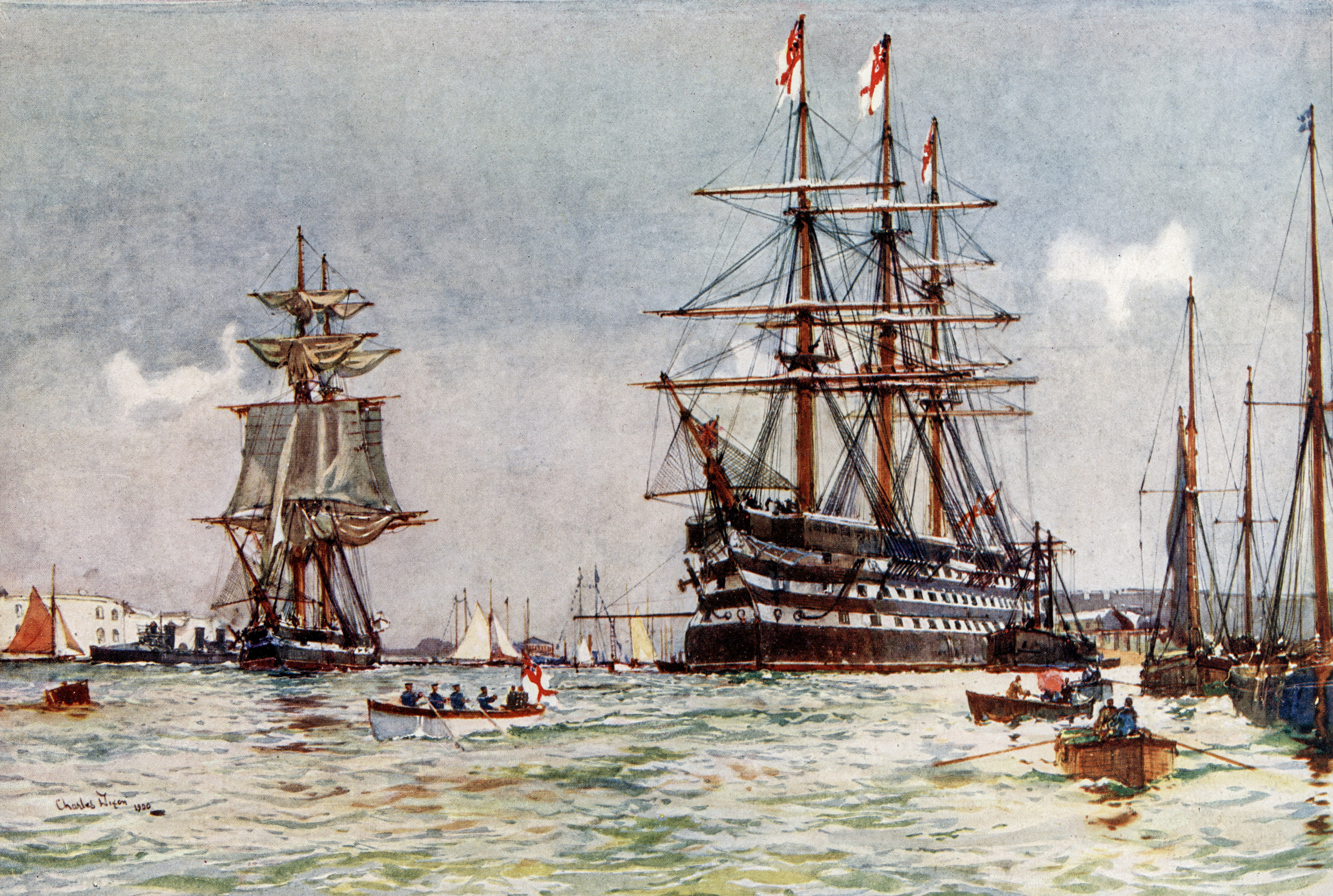
The first-rate, HMS St Vincent, which Dacres commanded. Painted by Charles Dixon

Dacres was born in 1804, the son of Captain, later Vice-Admiral, Sir Richard Dacres and Martha Phillips Milligan. The Dacres had a long history of naval service, Sydney's uncle, James Richard Dacres, was a vice-admiral, while his cousins Barrington Dacres and James Richard Dacres would both serve in the navy, the former becoming a post-captain, the latter a vice-admiral. His father, Richard Dacres, had served with Sir Sidney Smith as his flag captain aboard HMS Pompee during his Mediterranean campaign, and under Captain Sir John Colpoys, while Colpoys was commander of HMS Hannibal and HMS London. His elder brother Sir Richard James Dacres was a field marshal in the British Army and was also awarded the GCB.

Sydney joined the Royal Navy in 1817 at the age of 12, and after serving for ten years, was promoted to lieutenant on 5 May 1827, initially aboard the 46-gun HMS Blonde under Captain Edmund Lyons. On 18 October Lieutenant Dacres was involved in an attack on the Turkish forces at Morea, during the Greek War of Independence. He and other lieutenants from Blonde, working in company with French naval forces, landed guns and helped to build batteries.

Dacres was promoted to commander on 28 August 1834, being appointed to his first command, the paddle sloop HMS Salamander on 16 August 1836. He was promoted to post-captain on 1 August 1840 and duly relinquished command of the Salamander on 15 September 1840. He was briefly appointed to command HMS Avenger in 1847, before taking over command of the 120-gun first rate HMS St Vincent, from 16 November 1847. The St Vincent was at that time the flagship of Rear-Admiral Sir Charles John Napier, commander of the Channel Fleet. Dacres took command of the 50-gun frigate HMS Leander on 28 September 1849, commissioning her at Portsmouth and joining a Squadron of Evolution. He commanded the Leander until 3 June 1852, when he was shifted to the screw-propelled second rate HMS Sans Pareil. He took command on 8 June 1852, commissioning her at Plymouth and sailing her to Lisbon. She spent 1853 as part of the Channel squadron, then with the outbreak of the Crimean War Dacres sailed to the Black Sea in 1854 to support operations. Dacres remained in command until 22 November 1854, when he was succeeded by Acting-Captain Leopold George Heath. He was appointed a Companion of the Bath on 5 July 1855, and on 30 April 1857 he was among the British officers who fought in the Crimea who received permission from Queen Victoria to accept the award of Officer of the Legion of Honour.

== Senior command ==
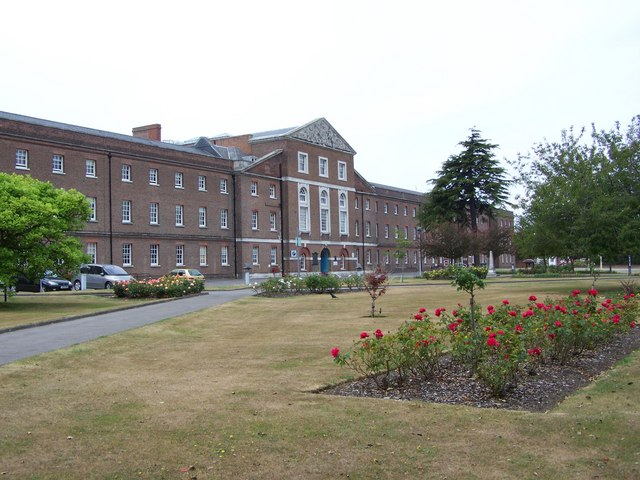
The Royal Hospital Haslar where Dacres was Captain-Superintendent

Dacres then moved ashore, becoming Captain-Superintendent of the Royal Hospital Haslar and the Royal Clarence (Gosport) Victualling Yard in July 1855, a post he held until 25 June 1858, the date he was promoted to rear-admiral. He became Captain of the fleet aboard HMS Marlborough to the commander-in-chief of the Mediterranean Fleet on 12 September 1859, serving under Vice-Admiral Arthur Fanshawe, and then Vice-Admiral William Fanshawe Martin. In April 1861 he flew his flag on HMS Caesar then from 16 December 1861 Dacres became second in command in the Mediterranean, flying his flag aboard HMS Edgar. He then became commander in chief of the Channel Squadron on 24 April 1863, a post he held until June 1866 and during which he oversaw the integration of the new ironclads into the fleet. He was appointed a Knight Commander of the Bath on 28 March 1865, and promoted to vice-admiral on 17 November 1865, while in command of the Channel Squadron.

Dacres became a Commissioner of the Admiralty and Second Naval Lord on 12 July 1866, rising to be the First Naval Lord on 18 December 1868. He was promoted to admiral on 1 April 1870, and was appointed a Knight Grand Cross of the Bath on 20 May 1871. His only significant action as First Naval Lord was to press for the abolition of masts. He stepped down as First Naval Lord on 27 November 1872, becoming Visitor and Governor of Greenwich Hospital on 2 December that year. He was placed on the retired list on 10 January 1874.

== Family and personal life ==
Dacres married Emma Lambert on 1 October 1840 at St Pancras New Church. She gave birth to a son at Batheaston on 3 December 1845. This was followed by the birth of a daughter on 10 January 1849 at Bath. His daughter Minna Winifred married, as her second husband, Admiral Sir John Ommanney Hopkins. Sydney Dacres died on 8 March 1884.

== See also ==
- O'Byrne, William Richard (1849). "Dacres, Sidney Colpoys" . A Naval Biographical Dictionary . John Murray – via Wikisource.
- List of British recipients of the Légion d'Honneur for the Crimean War

== Notes ==
Military offices
Preceded by Sir Robert Smart	Commander-in-Chief, Channel Fleet; 1863–1866	Succeeded by Sir Hastings Yelverton
Preceded by Sir Charles Eden	Second Naval Lord; 1866–1868	Succeeded by Vacant; Next held by Sir John Tarleton
Preceded by Sir Alexander Milne	First Naval Lord; 1868–1872	Succeeded by Sir Alexander Milne
Preceded by Sir Houston Stewart	Governor, Greenwich Hospital; 1872–1884	Succeeded by Sir Lewis Jones
