= Action of 10 April 1795 =

Naval engagement during the French Revolutionary Wars

- Part of the French Revolutionary Wars
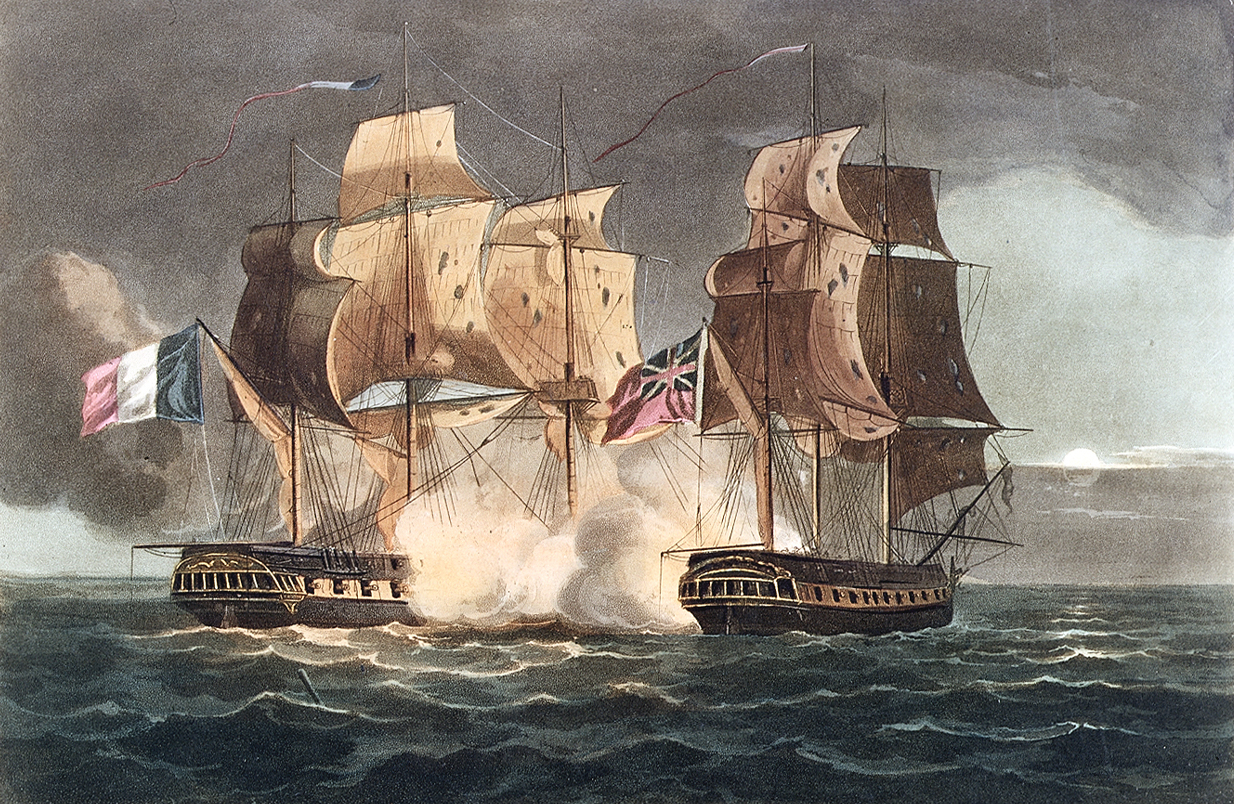
- Capture of La Gloire April 10th 1795, Thomas Whitcombe
Date	10–11 April 1795
Location	Western Approaches, Atlantic Ocean 49°30′N 10°46′W
Result	British victory

Belligerents
Great Britain	France

Commanders and leaders
John Colpoys	Captain Beenst

Strength
5 ships of the line 2 frigates	3 frigates

Casualties and losses
8 killed or wounded	40 killed or wounded 2 frigates captured

The action of 10 April 1795 was a minor naval engagement during the French Revolutionary Wars in which a squadron of French Navy frigates was intercepted by a British battle squadron under Rear-Admiral John Colpoys which formed part of the blockade of the French naval base of Brest in Brittany. The French squadron split up in the face of superior British numbers, the three vessels seeking to divide and outrun the British pursuit. One frigate, Gloire was followed by the British frigate HMS Astraea and was ultimately brought to battle in a closely fought engagement. Although the ships were roughly equal in size, the British ship was easily able to defeat the French in an engagement lasting just under an hour.

The other French ships were pursued by British ships of the line and the chase lasted much longer, into the morning of 11 April when HMS Hannibal caught the frigate Gentille. Hannibal was far larger than its opponent and the French captain surrendered immediately rather than fight a futile engagement. The third French frigate, Fraternité successfully escaped. After refitting in Portsmouth, Colpoys' ships returned to their station off Brest, the blockade remaining in place for the remainder of the year.

== Background ==
Great Britain and France had been at war for more than two years by April 1795, and British dominance at sea was well established, with the Royal Navy maintaining substantial blockade fleets off all of the principal French naval ports. The biggest port on the French Atlantic coast was at Brest in Brittany, from which French raiders could attack British shipping in the English Channel and Western Atlantic. The most efficient commerce raiders were frigates, light and fast warships that could strike rapidly and with devastating effect if left unopposed. One of the major roles of the British blockade squadrons was the detection and elimination of French frigates as they emerged from their bases.

In April 1795, the inshore squadron of the British blockade at Brest was commanded by Rear-Admiral John Colpoys, who had at his command five ships of the line: HMS London, HMS Valiant, HMS Colossus, HMS Hannibal and HMS Robust and frigates HMS Astraea and HMS Thalia. Colpoys' ships had formed an effective blockade: on 29 March they had taken the French corvette Jean Bart and the following day recaptured a lost British merchant ship. At 10:00 on 10 April, the British squadron was cruising off the approaches to Brest when three ships were spotted to the west.

Colpoys immediately ordered his squadron to give chase and at 12:00 the strange ships were identified as a squadron of French frigates. The French ships were the 32-gun Gloire, under Captain Beenst the Elder, Gentille, under Lieutenant Canon, and Fraternité, under Florinville, led by Captain Beenst of Gloire and on a three-month raiding cruise from Brest in the Bay of Biscay that had so-far been uneventful: the only prize taken had been a small Spanish merchant brig. Beenst quickly discovered the danger his squadron was in, and gave orders for them to sail westwards away from the British squadron. However, the wind favoured Colpoys and his vastly superior squadron rapidly gained on the French frigates. The first British ship to come within range was the 74-gun HMS Colossus under Captain John Monkton, which managed to exchange distant gunfire with the rearmost French ship before the gap widened once more.

== Battle ==
Seeing that his ships were in danger of being caught by the much larger British ships of the line, Captain Beenst gave orders for the squadron to separate. Gentille and Fraternité splitting from Gloire to the west with the ships of the line HMS Hannibal and HMS Robust in close pursuit while Gloire swung northwest, eluding most of the British squadron except for the 32-gun frigate HMS Astraea under Captain Lord Henry Paulet, which managed to stay in contact throughout the afternoon.

At 18:00, with the rest of the pursuit far behind, Paulet succeeded in bringing Gloire within range of the cannon on his ship's quarterdeck. Opening fire with these guns brought a response from Beenst's sternchaser guns, the frigates exchanging cannon shot for four and a half hours as Astraea slowly caught up with its elusive opponent. At 22:30, Paulet was finally close enough to lay Astraea alongside Gloire and the two frigates exchanged fire at close range for the next 58 minutes, Paulet concentrating his gunnery on the hull of the French ship while Beenst's ordered his men to disable the British ship's rigging and masts. The battle was fiercely contested: Beenst suffered a head injury and all three of Astraea's topmasts taking serious damage, so much so that the main topmast collapsed in the aftermath of the action. However at 23:28, with two British ships of the line visible in the distance, Beenst surrendered his ship to Paulet.

Both ships had suffered damage, with the injuries to Astraea's masts requiring urgent repairs while Gloire had also suffered damage to its rigging and sails. The French ship had also taken heavy casualties, with 40 men killed or wounded, including the captain. In contrast, Astraea had not lost a single man, although one of the eight wounded subsequently died. Paulet effected repairs to both ships and gave temporary command of Gloire to Lieutenant John Talbot, who was subsequently promoted. He then brought both ships to the Portsmouth, where Colpoys was reconstituting his scattered squadron.

== Aftermath ==
It was while sailing off the Isle of Wight that Colpoys learned from Captain Edward Thornbrough of Robust that Hannibal had succeeded in catching the French frigate Gentille early on the morning of 11 April. The French captain surrendering without a fight before the overwhelming British force that he faced, shocked that his frigate had been caught by a ship of the line in open waters. In response, Hannibal's captain, John Markham, proudly claimed that "Hannibal sails like a witch". Hannibal subsequently joined Robust in the chase of Fraternité, succeeding in firing several shot at the French ship before falling behind in a period of calm weather. After a chase of several days, Fraternité's captain lightened his ship by throwing guns and stores overboard and ultimately escaped pursuit, later rejoining the Brest fleet and participating in a number of subsequent campaigns. Both Gloire and Gentille were purchased for the Royal Navy, the entirety of Colpoy's squadron sharing in the prize money by prior arrangement. Neither ship was in particularly good condition however and neither had long service in the British fleet. Colpoys returned to the inshore blockade of Brest with his squadron following a brief refit at Portsmouth, remaining off the port for the remainder of the year.

Lieutenant Canon received the customary was court-martial following the loss of his ship, and was acquitted of all charges.
