= Dacre =

Dacre may refer to:

== Places ==
- Dacre, Cumbria, England
  - Dacre Castle
- Dacre, North Yorkshire, England
- Dacre, New Zealand, in the Southland Region
- Dacre, Ontario, Canada

== People ==
- Baron Dacre, an English hereditary title
- Charlotte Dacre (1782–1841), English author
- Henry Hugh Gordon Stoker (1885–1966), Irish navy officer and actor who took Dacre Stoker as his stage name
- Hugh Trevor-Roper (1914–2003), historian who chose Baron Dacre as his title
- Jane Dacre (born 1955), British rheumatologist
- Paul Dacre (born 1948), editor of British newspaper the Daily Mail
- Dacre Stoker (born 1958), Canadian-American author, sportsman, and filmmaker
- Dacre Montgomery (born 1994), Australian actor

== Other uses ==
- Dacre knot, a heraldic knot
- Dacre Shanks, a fictional serial killer and parody of Freddy Krueger in Demon Road

== See also ==
- Dacres, a surname
- Dacor (disambiguation)
