= Richard Dacres (British Army officer) =

British Army officer (1799–1886)

Field Marshal Sir Richard Dacres GCB
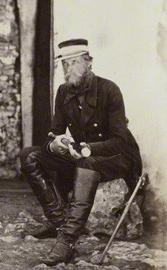
- Sir Richard Dacres
- Born: 30 July 1799
- Died: 6 December 1886 (aged 86 or 87); Brighton
- Relatives: Richard Dacres (father); Sydney Dacres (brother); James Richard Dacres (uncle); Barrington Dacres (cousin); James Richard Dacres (cousin)
- Military career
- Allegiance: United Kingdom
- Branch: British Army
- Service years: 1817–1884
- Rank: Field Marshal
- Conflicts: Battle of Alma; Battle of Balaclava; Battle of Inkerman; Siege of Sevastopol
- Awards: Knight Grand Cross of the Order of the Bath; Commander of the Order of Savoy; Commander of the Légion d'honneur Second Class of the Order of Medjidie

Field Marshal Sir Richard James Dacres, GCB (30 July 1799 – 6 December 1886) was a British Army officer during the nineteenth century. Born into a substantial naval dynasty, he would achieve similar status in the military, commanding three troops of Royal Horse Artillery at the Battles of Alma in September 1854, Balaclava in October 1854 and Inkerman in November 1854, and throughout the Siege of Sevastopol during the Crimean War and eventually rising to the rank of field marshal.

== Family and early life ==
Richard James was born on 30 July 1799, the son of Richard Dacres, who became a vice-admiral in the Royal Navy, and his wife Martha Phillips Milligan. The Dacres had a long history of naval service, Sydney's uncle, James Richard Dacres, was a vice-admiral, while his cousins Barrington Dacres and James Richard Dacres would both serve in the navy, the former becoming a post-captain, the latter a vice-admiral. His younger brother, Sydney Dacres, also had a naval career, eventually reaching the rank of Admiral, and serving as a First Naval Lord. Richard James attended the Royal Military Academy, Woolwich, in 1815, and embarked on a career with the army when he joined the Royal Artillery as a second lieutenant on 15 December 1817.

== Career ==
Dacres was promoted to first lieutenant on 29 August 1825, and a second captain on 18 December 1837. He transferred to the Royal Horse Artillery in 1843 and was promoted to major on 11 November 1851. He became a lieutenant-colonel on 23 February 1852, and was appointed to command the three troops of Royal Horse Artillery sent to take part in the Crimean War. He and his forces were attached to the cavalry, commanded by Lord Lucan. Dacres commanded his forces at the Battles of Alma in September 1854, Balaclava in October 1854 and Inkerman in November 1854, and throughout the Siege of Sevastopol. He was with the headquarters-staff at Balaclava, having his horse killed under him. When Brigadier-General Fox-Strangways was killed in the battle, Dacres took over command of all the artillery in the Crimea, retaining the post until the end of the war.

He was advanced to the local rank of colonel on 23 February 1855, brigadier general on 30 March 1855, and was promoted to major-general on 29 June that year. He was created a Knight Commander of the Bath on 5 July 1855 for his services in the capture of artillery at Sevastopol, as well as a Commander of the Order of Savoy, and a Commander of the Légion d'honneur. He was also among the officers authorised to accept the appointment to the Second Class of the Order of Medjidie on 2 March 1858. Dacres was appointed Commandant of the Woolwich district in May 1859, holding the position until 1865.

Dacres was made colonel-commandant of the Royal Horse Artillery on 28 July 1864, and was promoted to lieutenant general on 10 December 1864. He was appointed a Knight Grand Cross of the Order of the Bath on 2 June 1869. He was retired from active service at the rank of colonel-commandant on 2 October 1877, and was subsequently appointed to the position of Constable of the Tower on 27 July 1881, a position he occupied when the tower was one of the London targets bombed on 24 January 1885 by Feinian terrorists, wounding several people and causing some damage by fire. He became master gunner of England in 1882. Dacres was made a field marshal in July 1886, but died at Brighton on 6 December 1886 at the age of 87. He was succeeded as Constable of the Tower and Lord Lieutenant of the Tower Hamlets by The Lord Napier of Magdala on 6 January 1887.

== Family and personal life ==
Dacres married Frances Brooking Thomas, granddaughter of William Bevil Thomas, at St. John's, Newfoundland, on 3 November 1840.

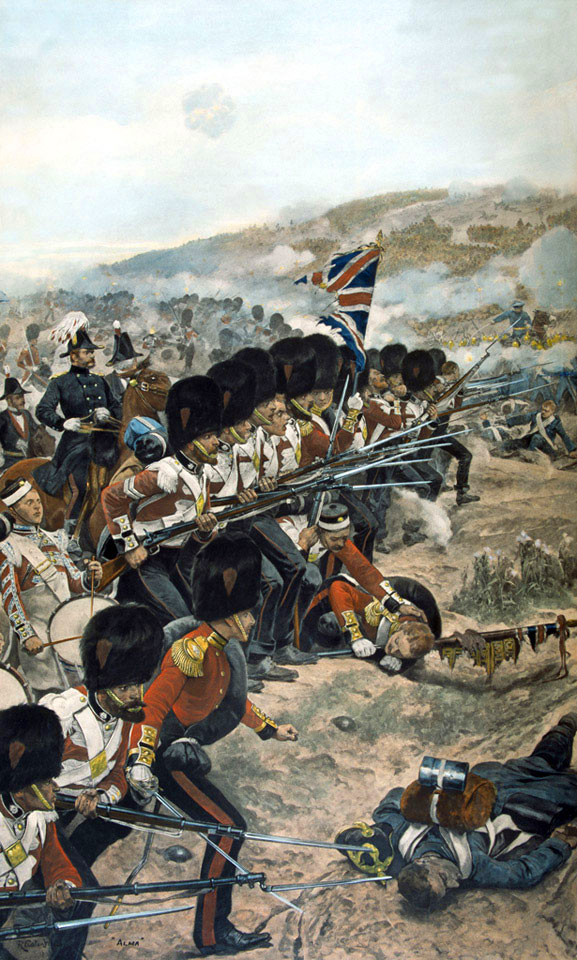
The Battle of Alma, at which Dacres commanded the Royal Horse Artillery, during the Crimean War

== Sources ==
- Annual Register. Vol. 83. London: F. & J. Rivington. 1842.
- Dod, Robert P. (1860). The Peerage, Baronetage, and Knightage, of Great Britain and Ireland for 1860. London: Whitaker and Co.
- Laughton, J. K. (2004). "Dacres, Sir Sydney Colpoys (1805–1884)". In rev. Andrew Lambert (ed.). Oxford Dictionary of National Biography. Oxford Dictionary of National Biography (online ed.). Oxford University Press. doi:10.1093/ref:odnb/6997. (Subscription, Wikipedia Library access or UK public library membership required.)
- Melchiori, Barbara Arnett (1985). Terrorism in the Late Victorian Novel. Taylor & Francis. ISBN 0-7099-3583-8.
- Stephen, Leslie, ed. (1888). "Dacres, Richard James" . Dictionary of National Biography. Vol. 13. London: Smith, Elder & Co.
- Tracy, Nicholas (2006). Who's who in Nelson's Navy: 200 Naval Heroes. London: Chatham Publishing. ISBN 1-86176-244-5.

Honorary titles
Preceded by Sir William Fenwick Williams, Bt	Constable of the Tower; Lord Lieutenant of the Tower Hamlets; 1881–1886	Succeeded by The Lord Napier of Magdala
