= Richard Dacres (Royal Navy officer) =

British naval officer (1761–1837)

Vice-Admiral Sir Richard Dacres GCH
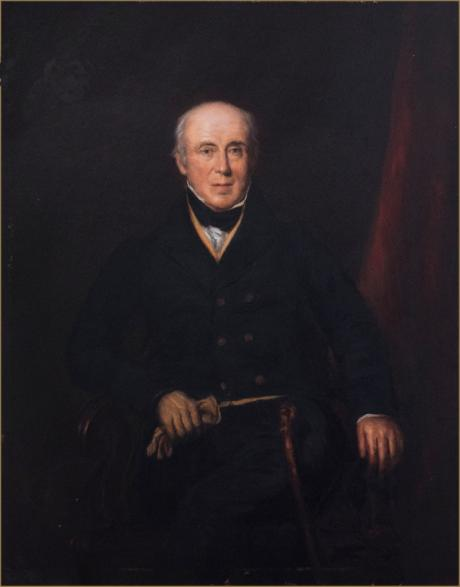
- Born: September 1761
- Died: 22 January 1837 (aged 75–76); Balibroke Villas, near Bath, Somerset
- Relatives: James Richard Dacres (brother); Sydney Dacres (son); Richard James Dacres (son); Barrington Dacres (nephew); James Richard Dacres (nephew)
- Military career
- Allegiance: Great Britain; United Kingdom
- Branch: Royal Navy
- Service years: 1775–1837
- Rank: Vice-Admiral
- Commands: Hired armed brig Union; HMS Childers; HMS Camilla; HMS Astraea; HMS Juste; HMS De Ruyter; HMS Desiree; HMS Pompee; Royal Naval Asylum, Greenwich
- Conflicts: American Revolutionary War; Battle of the Chesapeake; Battle of St. Kitts; Battle of the Saintes; French Revolutionary Wars; Napoleonic Wars; Dardanelles operation; Alexandria expedition of 1807; Battle of Copenhagen
- Awards: Knight Grand Cross of the Royal Guelphic Order

Sir Richard Dacres GCH (September 1761 – 22 January 1837) was an officer of the British Royal Navy who saw service during the American War of Independence, and the French Revolutionary and Napoleonic Wars. A member of a substantial naval dynasty, he eventually rose to the rank of vice admiral.

== Family and early life ==
Richard Dacres was born in September 1761, the fifth son of Richard and Mary Dacres, and younger brother to James Richard Dacres. The Dacres would eventually become a substantial naval dynasty; James Richard rose to be a vice-admiral, his son Barrington became a post-captain, and James became a vice-admiral. Richard's own son Sydney would eventually be an admiral, and First Sea Lord.

== American war ==
Dacres himself entered the navy in 1775 to serve aboard the 50-gun fourth rate Renown under Captain Francis Banks. He was present at the evacuation of Boston, the capture of New York —serving under Sir Peter Parker— the occupation of Aquidneck Island, and in various other services. He remained aboard Renown until 1778, when he returned to England and joined the frigate Apollo, under Captain Philemon Pownall, and was present at the capture of the French frigate Oiseau on 31 January 1779.

Dacres then served aboard Victory, flagship of Sir Charles Hardy, Commander-in Chief of the Channel Fleet. Hardy promoted Dacres to lieutenant into the frigate Amazon, under Captain the Honourable William Finch, with whom he sailed to the West Indies in early 1780. On 10/11 October 1780 Amazon narrowly escaped destruction during a violent hurricane, having to cut down her masts and throw her guns and anchors overboard to prevent the ship from capsizing. Twenty of her crew were drowned or badly hurt.

He then served as first lieutenant of the 74-gun Alcide, Captain Charles Thompson. He was present with Rear-Admiral Thomas Graves's fleet at the Battle of the Chesapeake in 1781, Rear-Admiral Samuel Hood's fleet at the Battle of St. Kitts in 1782 and Admiral George Brydges Rodney's fleet at the Battle of the Saintes in 1782.

Dacres remained in Alcide till 1783, when he was appointed to Bombay Castle, Captain Herbert Sawyer, guard ship at Portsmouth, remaining in her for two years, before following Commodore Sawyer into his flagship, the 50-gun Leander, on the North American Station, until paid off in September 1788. During the Spanish Armament of 1790, Dacres was first appointed to the 64-gun Dictator, then to Windsor Castle, flagship of now Rear Admiral Sawyer. After the crisis was resolved peacefully, Dacres returned to half-pay until the outbreak of the war with Revolutionary France in February 1793.

== War with France ==
He was initially given command of the hired armed brig Union; before being appointed first lieutenant of the 74-gun Hannibal, under the command of Captain John Colpoys. With Hannibal Dacres became part of the squadron despatched under Admiral Alan Gardner to the reinforce the British possessions in the West Indies.

Hannibal was put out of commission in early 1794, and he was appointed first lieutenant of the frigate Diamond, commanded by Captain W. Sidney Smith, but remained there only a short time before moving to the 90-gun second rate London, serving under his old commander, now Rear-Admiral John Colpoys. Dacres was promoted to commander on 10 March 1795 into the 14-gun sloop Childers. While captain of Childers Dacres captured the French Coast guard cutter Vigilante, of six guns, in the Bay of Saint Brieux. On 31 October he was appointed post captain on the 20-gun Camilla, which formed part of Richard Strachan's squadron in the English Channel.

In early 1797, Dacres took command of the frigate Astraea. He managed to slip away from the mutiny at the Nore, and then escorted a fleet of valuable merchant ships to the Baltic. He captured numerous French and Dutch privateers over the next two years. Astrea was paid off in 1799, and Dacres was again unemployed until early 1801, when he was appointed to command of the 80-gun Juste, accompanying Sir Robert Calder in his voyage to the Caribbean, following Ganteaume's escape from Brest. On his return to England, he was appointed to the 68-gun De Ruyter, guard ship at Spithead, remaining there until the cessation of hostilities in early 1802. He then sailed to Jamaica in Desiree with the squadron under Sir George Campbell, but ill-health soon forced him to return home. On the renewal of the war in 1803, Dacres was appointed to command of the Sea Fencibles at Dartmouth.

In 1806 Sir W. Sidney Smith specifically requested Dacres join him in the Mediterranean as his flag captain aboard the 80-gun Pompee. In this role Dacres went on to see service in the amphibious operations at Calabria, leading to the Battle of Maida, and later Admiral John Thomas Duckworth's failed Dardanelles Operation and the Alexandria expedition in February 1807. Dacres then returned to England after Pompee's recall, arriving in June 1807. He was then ordered to take the Pompee to join Vice-Admiral Henry Stanhope's squadron for service in the second expedition to Copenhagen. He was involved in the subsequent Battle of Copenhagen, where he and the navy provided support for the besieging forces.

== Later life ==
Dacres returned from the campaign, which proved to be his last command at sea. On 2 February 1808 he was appointed the first governor of the Royal Naval Asylum after its move to Greenwich, serving there until August 1816. He was promoted to rear-admiral on 29 March 1817 on the Retired List, and a vice-admiral on 22 July 1830. He was nominated a Knight Grand Cross of the Royal Guelphic Order on 25 January 1836, and died at Balibroke Villas, near Bath, Somerset on 22 January 1837 at the age of 75.

== Family and personal life ==
In 1788 he married Martha Phillips Milligan, by whom he had at least four children; his son Richard James Dacres (1799–1886) joined the army and rose to be a field marshal, while Sydney Colpoys Dacres (1805–1884), went on to be an admiral and First Naval Lord. His eldest daughter Martha married Rear Admiral Sir William Fairbrother Carrol in 1813, while the younger, Mary, married Lieutenant Colonel Henry Stephen Olivier in 1823.
