= John Markham (Royal Navy officer) =

Royal Navy Admiral (1761–1827)

Admiral John Markham
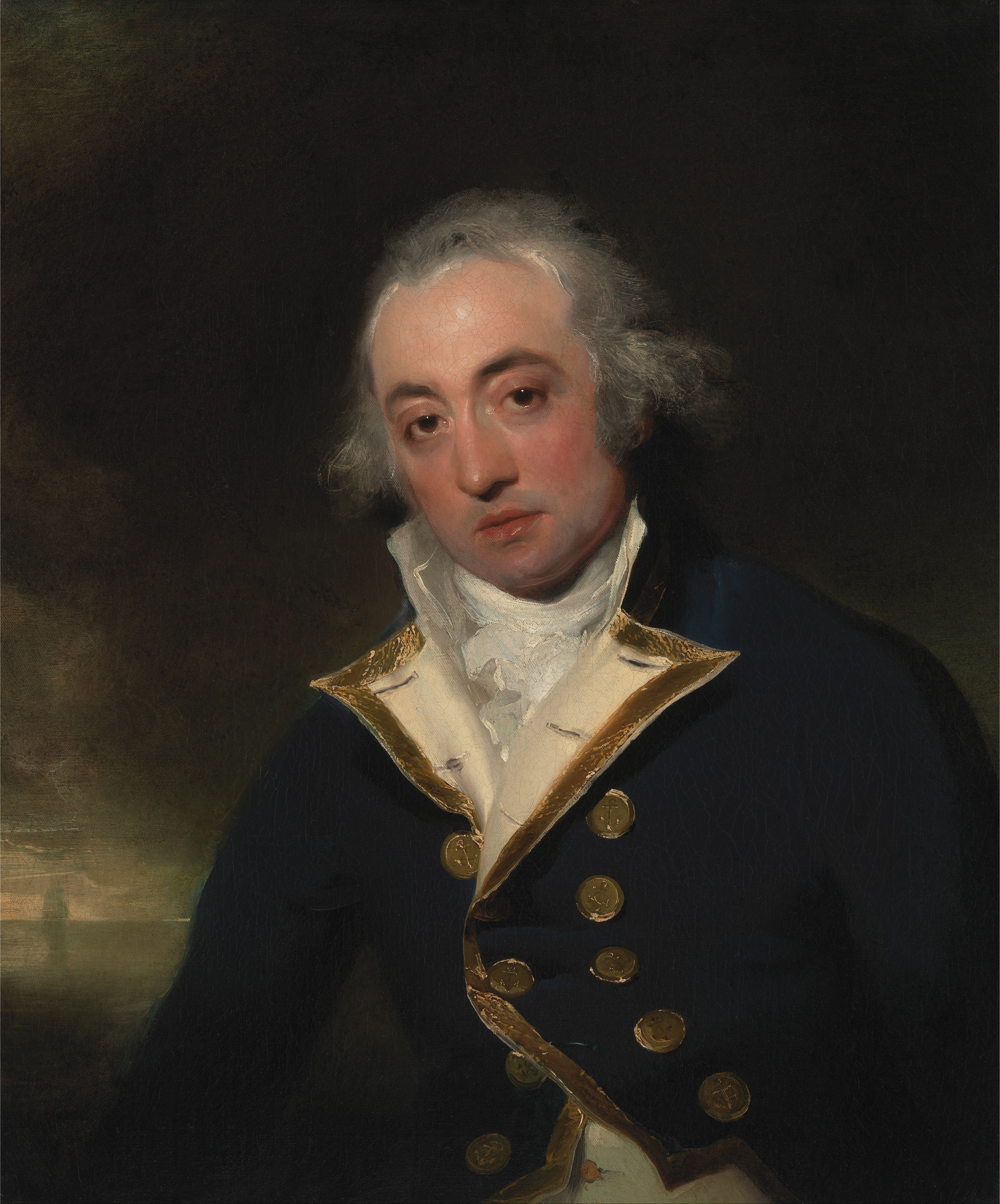
- Admiral John Markham (Thomas Lawrence, ca. 1793)
- Born: 13 June 1761; Westminster
- Died: 13 February 1827 (aged 65); Naples
- Military career
- Allegiance: United Kingdom
- Branch: Royal Navy
- Service years: 1775–1826
- Rank: Admiral
- Commands: Volcano; Zebra; HMS Sphinx; HMS Blonde; HMS Hannibal; HMS Centaur
- Conflicts: American Revolutionary War; Siege of Charleston; Battle of Cape Henry; French Revolutionary Wars; Action of 10 April 1795; Napoleonic Wars
- Other work: MP for Portsmouth

Admiral John Markham (13 June 1761 – 13 February 1827) was a Royal Navy officer. As a junior officer he served in the American Revolutionary War. He commanded the third-rate HMS Hannibal in the action of 10 April 1795 and then the third-rate HMS Centaur, capturing a French frigate squadron in the action of 18 June 1799, during the French Revolutionary Wars. He went on to be a Lord Commissioner of the Admiralty and First Naval Lord under Earl St Vincent. He also served as MP for Portsmouth.

== Naval career ==
Markham was born in 1761 at Westminster, second son to William Markham, the Archbishop of York, and Sarah Goddard. One of his seven sisters, Frederica, later became Countess of Mansfield. He was educated at Westminster School. In March 1775, he joined the Royal Navy at the outbreak of the American Revolutionary War. He served under George Elphinstone in HMS Romney and HMS Perseus.

Going to the West Indies in February 1777, the Perseus captured another privateer, to which again young Markham was sent as prize-master, and a third time, in May, Markham was appointed in a like capacity to a large merchant-ship, captured on the coast of Carolina. He had with him four men and a boy from the Perseus, and four of the prisoners, americanised Frenchmen, to assist in working the ship. During a violent gale the ship sprang a leak, and became waterlogged. The English seamen, growing desperate, got dead drunk, and the Frenchmen, arming themselves as they best could, attacked Markham, who was at the helm. He succeeded, however, in beating them below. The ship, too, though waterlogged, was laden with barrel-staves, and kept afloat until her crew were rescued by a passing vessel. Some months later, he arrived in England, to find his family in mourning for him, Elphinstone having written that he had certainly been lost with the ship.

Markham subsequently served on the North American and West Indian stations in HMS Phoenix, HMS Roebuck, HMS Royal Oak, HMS London, HMS Volcano and HMS Zebra, participating at the Siege of Charleston and the Battle of Cape Henry.

Markham went to Jamaica, where, in March 1782, Sir Peter Parker, 1st Baronet promoted him to command the Volcano fireship. In May, Rodney moved him to the Zebra sloop, and sent him out to cruise off Cape Tiburon. On 22 May, he fell in with a brig flying a French ensign. He chased her, and was fast gaining on her, when she hoisted a union jack at the fore. Markham supposed that this was a signal to a small craft in company, and as the motions of the brig were otherwise suspicious, he fired into her. It then appeared that she was a cartel, and meant the English jack for a flag of truce. On the complaint of the French lieutenant in command, Markham was tried by court-martial and cashiered, but Rodney, reviewing the evidence, reinstated him on his own authority, and the king in council, on the report of the admiralty, completely restored him, 13 November. He received half-pay for the time, June to November, that he was out of the service, and on 3 January 1783, was promoted to the rank of post-captain.

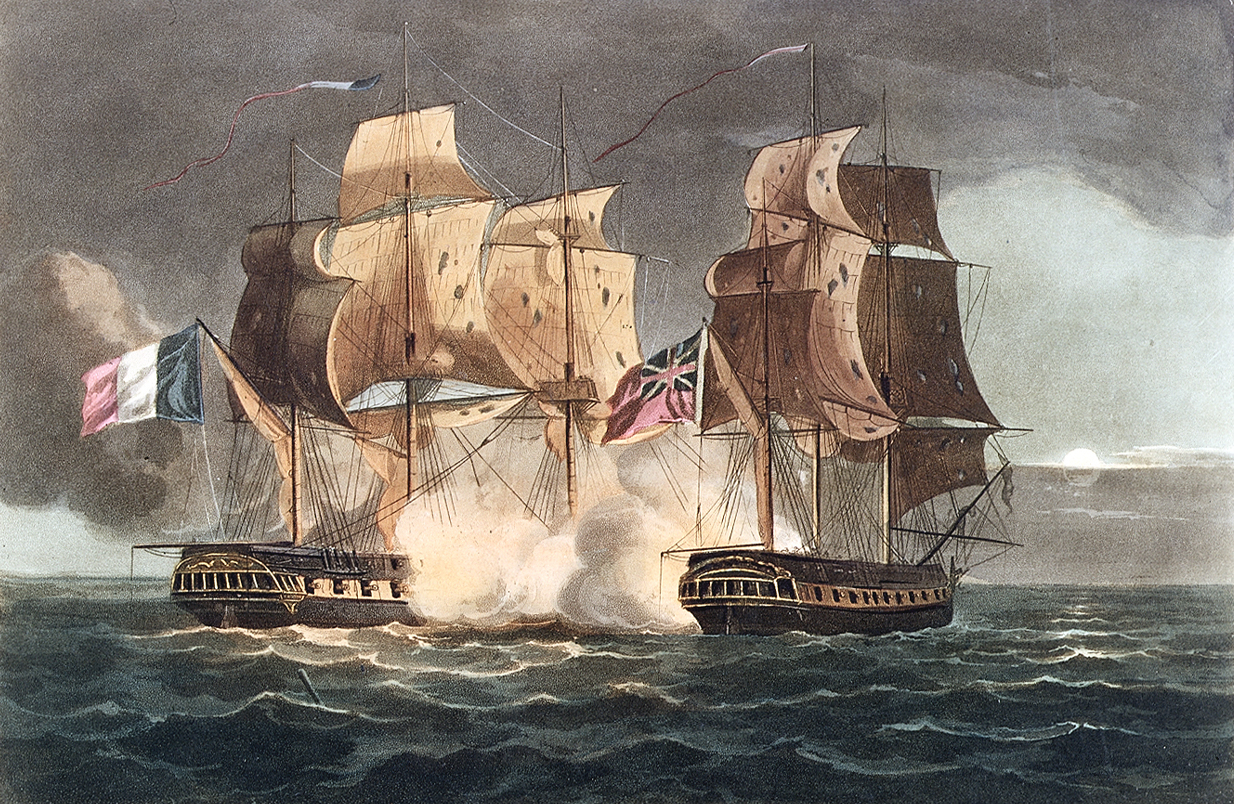
The Capture of La Gloire April 10th 1795, Thomas Whitcombe, 1816, National Maritime Museum; Marham commanded the ship of the line HMS Hannibal during the action

From 1783 to 1786, Markham commanded HMS Sphinx and was subsequently in reserve until the outbreak of the French Revolutionary Wars in 1793. He commanded HMS Blonde in the West Indies and then moved in 1795 to the ship of the line HMS Hannibal, seeing action at the action of 10 April 1795. He then sailed to the West Indies, but came down with yellow fever and was dangerously ill, forcing his return to Britain. In 1797, he took command of HMS Centaur. He spent much of summer 1797 as one of the judges on the courts martial that followed the Nore mutiny. He then served in Centaur off Ireland, in the Mediterranean and off the French coast, capturing a French frigate squadron in the action of 18 June 1799, until in February 1801 he was appointed to the Board of Admiralty by Earl St Vincent, with whom he had served in the Mediterranean. Promoted to rear admiral on 23 April 1804, he remained at the admiralty until May 1804, and resumed a position there, as First Naval Lord from January 1806, before retiring completely in March 1807. He was promoted to vice admiral on 25 October 1809.

Although Markham remained in the Navy and was eventually promoted to full admiral on 12 August 1819, he did not serve in a command capacity again. He had however been elected to Parliament in 1801 on the death of Lord Hugh Seymour, sitting for the constituency of Portsmouth from 1801 to 1818 and then again from 1820 to 1826. He retired from all public life in 1826 due to ill health, and died in Naples early on 13 February 1827.

== Family ==
In 1796, he married Maria Rice, daughter of George Rice. He had three sons, one of whom, Frederick Markham became a noted army officer in British India. In 1828, immediately John Markham's death, his family acquired Morland House near Penrith in Cumbria where a room in the house commemorates his life.

== Sources ==
- This article incorporates text from a publication now in the public domain: Laughton, John Knox (1893). "Markham, John (1761-1827)". In Lee, Sidney (ed.). Dictionary of National Biography. Vol. 36. London: Smith, Elder & Co. pp. 171–172.
- Rodger, N.A.M. (1979). The Admiralty. Offices of State. Lavenham: T. Dalton Ltd. ISBN 0900963948.

Military offices
| Preceded by James Gambier | First Naval Lord; 1806–1807 | Succeeded by James Gambier |
Parliament of the United Kingdom
| Preceded by Lord Hugh Seymour; Thomas Erskine | Member of Parliament for Portsmouth; 1801–1818; With: Thomas Erskine; Sir Thomas Miller; John Bonham Carter | Succeeded by John Bonham Carter; Sir George Cockburn |
| Preceded by John Bonham Carter; Sir George Cockburn | Member of Parliament for Portsmouth; 1820–1826; With: John Bonham Carter | Succeeded by John Bonham Carter; Francis Baring |
