= Charleston Bar =

Coordinates: 32.730°N 79.851°W

Charleston Bar is a series of submerged shoals lying about eight miles southeast of Charleston, South Carolina, United States.

== See also ==
- Battle of Sullivan's Island
