= Dacorum (disambiguation) =

Dacorum is a borough in Hertfordshire, England. The term may also refer to:

- Dacorum, a Latin word meaning "of the Dacians"
- Dacorum, various Roman auxiliary regiments

== See also ==
- Decorum
