= Royal Naval Asylum =

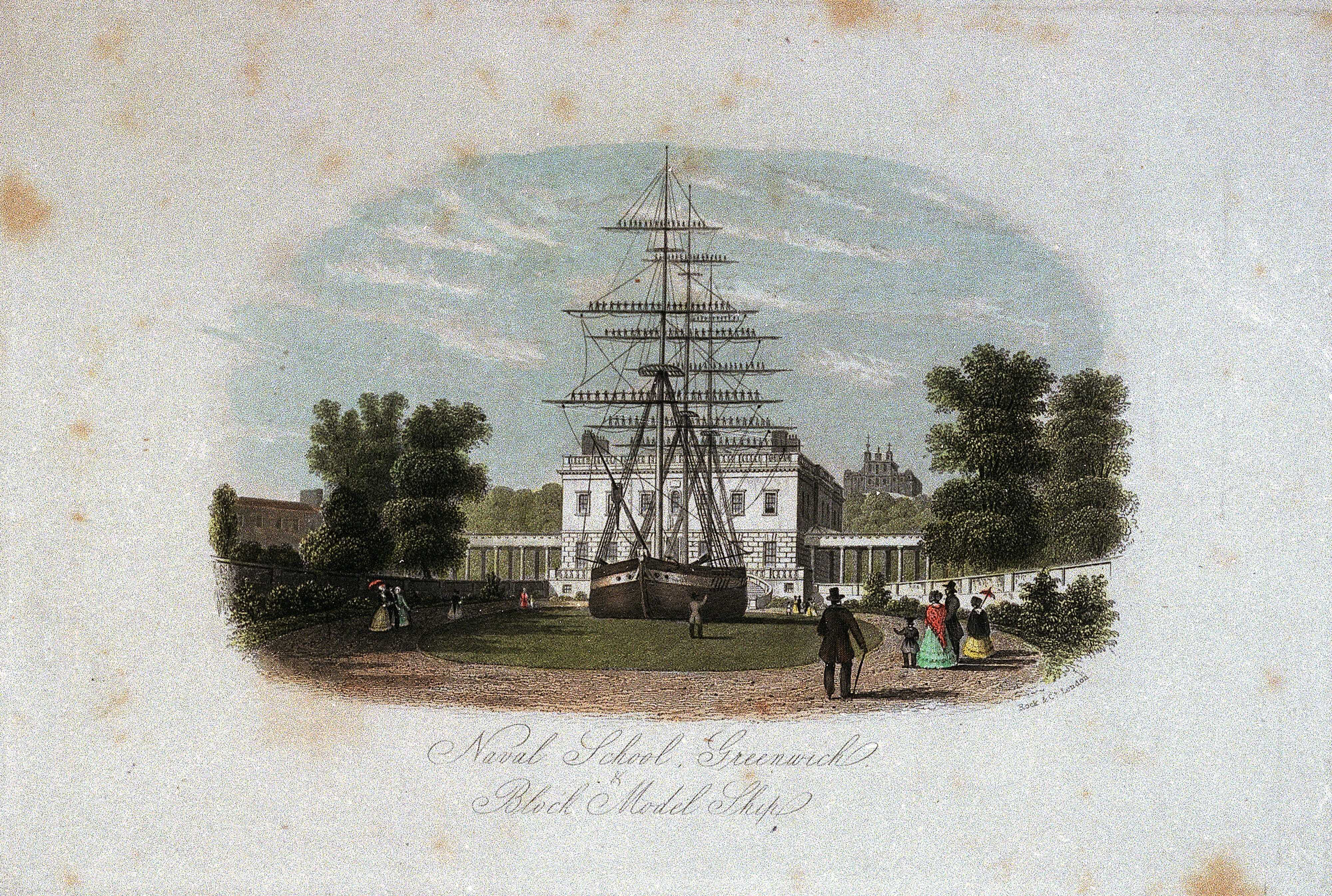
- Naval School, Greenwich and Block Model Ship ('Fame'), circa 1843

Information
- Former name: The British National Endeavour
- Established: 1798

The Royal Naval Asylum was an educational institution, founded under the name The British National Endeavour in 1798, that later merged with the Royal Hospital School in Greenwich. The school was founded by Mr Andrew Thompson, who appealed to the charity of the British population with his idea for a small "industrial school" for the orphans of military and naval personnel killed in action whilst defending Britain's interests. The school provided basic education to children, as well as military drill and armed forces training. The school had its own military band.

== History ==
The school was begun in Clarence House, Paddington Green, but Thompson was rapidly overtaken by scandal, insinuating fraud on his part. The school was taken under the leadership of a committee led by the Duke of Sussex, and then the Duke of Cumberland, and Mr Thompson was eventually acquitted of the charges and released, but by then the Duke of York conceived the idea of a "Military Asylum" and made plans, so it was decided to continue the "British National Endeavour" school as a "Naval Asylum" with ambitious and progressive plans, but without Thompson. King George III gave it the title Royal Naval Asylum following the defeat of the combined French and Spanish Fleets by the British at the Battle of Trafalgar.

After acquiring the Queen's House in Greenwich, and making substantial alterations, the school moved from Paddington to Greenwich in October 1807. This move, and the subsequent expansion, were assisted by a large grant of over £61,000 by Lloyd's Patriotic Fund. Horatio, Lord Nelson, was a supporter. The school was expanded to take 1,000 pupils, both boys and girls, and in 1818 it was placed under the control of the Board of Admiralty. In April 1821 the school was placed under the administration of Greenwich Hospital, and in 1825 it became the "Lower School" of the Royal Hospital Greenwich. After a series of reorganisations it has become an ancestor of the Royal Hospital School.
