= Barrington Dacres =

Captain Barrington Dacres
- Died: 25 October 1806; Bath, Somerset
- Relatives: James Richard Dacres (father); James Richard Dacres (brother); Richard Dacres (uncle)
- Military career
- Allegiance: United Kingdom
- Branch: Royal Navy
- Service years: – 1806
- Rank: Captain
- Commands: HMS Bulldog; HMS Culloden; HMS Venerable; HMS Theseus; HMS Hercule

Barrington Dacres (died 25 October 1806) was an officer of the Royal Navy, who saw service during the French Revolutionary and Napoleonic Wars. He eventually rose to the rank of Post-Captain. He did not see action in many significant engagements, and is chiefly remembered for the accidental loss of his ship to the French, and for the unsuccessful chase of two French ships in the English Channel. He did command a number of ships of the line under several of the leading naval commanders of his time. His early death, however, prevented him from achieving the same seniority and degree of fame as his relatives did.

== Family and early life ==
Barrington was born the eldest son of Captain, later Vice-Admiral, James Richard Dacres, and his wife Eleanor Blandford Pearce. The Dacres would eventually become a substantial naval dynasty. Barrington's brother James Richard Dacres became a vice-admiral, as did Barrington's uncle Richard Dacres, while his cousin Sydney Dacres became an admiral, and First Sea Lord.

== Career ==
Barrington Dacres took command of the newly converted bomb vessel HMS Bulldog in 1799. He remained in command until 27 February 1801, when he put into the Italian port of Ancona, unaware that it had been captured by the French. The French seized the Bulldog. Captain Thomas Rogers of HMS Mercury attempted to recapture the Bulldog by cutting her out of the port. Although Rogers was nearly successful, the British were forced to abandon her again. She was finally retaken off Gallipoli on 16 September 1801 by Lord William Stuart's HMS Champion. Dacres's career does not appear to have been particularly adversely affected by the accidental loss of his ship. He was promoted to Post-Captain on 29 April 1802. He took command of the 74-gun third rate HMS Culloden in May 1803, and recommissioned her in July that year. On 5 June, he captured the Petronelle. By September, he was cruising in the English Channel as part of Sir Edward Pellew's squadron, when the French 74-gun Duguay-Trouin was spotted sailing in company with the 38-gun frigate Guerrière. The two had already been engaged by HMS Boadicea, under Captain John Maitland, but the French ships had driven her off and were now bound for Corunna. Dacres took the Culloden in pursuit, eventually closing the distance and opening fire. The Duguay-Trouin was first to reach the safety of the port, but Dacres continued to engage the Guerrière until he was almost under the guns of the shore batteries. He eventually veered away, having inflicted considerable damage and several casualties. Dacres remained in command of Culloden until being succeeded by Captain George Reynolds in February 1804.

Dacres then took command of the 74-gun HMS Venerable in February, and was involved in the blockade of Brest, under Rear-Admiral Cuthbert Collingwood. He was succeeded by John Hunter in August 1804. By January 1805, Dacres was briefly aboard HMS Theseus, taking over from Captain Francis Temple, but by March, Temple was back in command. He took command of HMS Hercule, capturing a number of merchant vessels carrying sugar on 9 July 1806.

== Death ==
Barrington Dacres appears to have been in poor health and died at Bath, Somerset on 25 October 1806. He predeceased his father, who died in January 1810.
