= HMS Hannibal (1786) =

Ship of the line of the Royal Navy

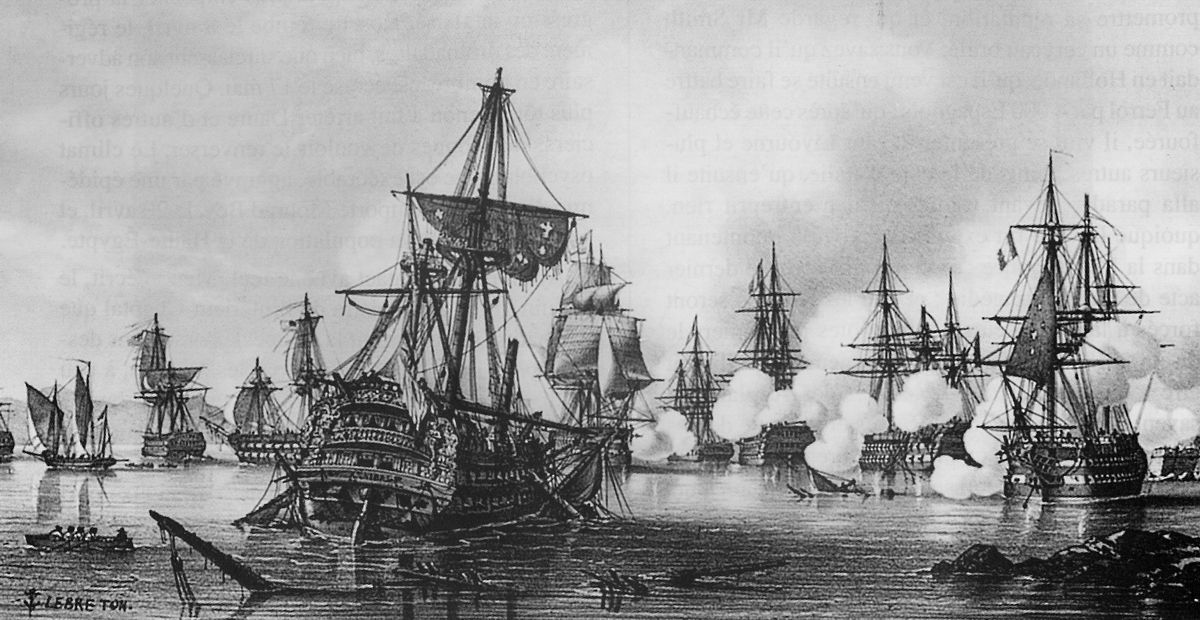
- Hannibal (centre-left) at the First Battle of Algeciras

History

Great Britain
- Name: HMS Hannibal
- Ordered: 19 June 1782
- Builder: Perry, Blackwall Yard
- Laid down: April 1783
- Launched: 15 April 1786
- Honours and awards: Participated in: First Battle of Algeciras
- Captured: 6 July 1801 by the French at the First Battle of Algeciras

France
- Name: Annibal
- Acquired: 6 July 1801
- Fate: Broken up 1824

General characteristics
- Class & type: Culloden-class ship of the line
- Tons burthen: 161957/94 (bm)
- Length: 170 ft (51.8 m) (gundeck)
- Beam: 47 ft 6 3/4 in (14.5 m)
- Depth of hold: 20 ft 0 in (6.1 m)
- Propulsion: Sails
- Sail plan: Full-rigged ship
- Armament: Gundeck: 28 × 32-pounder guns; Upper gundeck: 28 × 18-pounder guns; QD: 14 × 9-pounder guns; Fc: 4 × 9-pounder guns

HMS Hannibal was a 74-gun third-rate ship of the line of the Royal Navy, launched on 15 April 1786, named after the Carthaginian general Hannibal. She is best known for having taken part in the Algeciras Campaign, and for having run aground during the First Battle of Algeciras on 5 July 1801, which resulted in her capture. She then served in the French Navy until she was broken up in 1824.

== Early service ==
Hannibal was commissioned in August 1787, under Captain Richard Boger.

In May 1790, Hannibal was recommissioned under Captain John Colpoys. She was recommissioned in August 1791, for service as a guardship at Plymouth. When war with France became increasing likely towards end of 1792, the guardships at the three naval seaports were ordered to rendezvous at Spithead. Hannibal and the other Plymouth-based ships left on 11 December and arrived at Spithead the next day. The guardships from the other ports took longer to arrive.

On 15 February 1793, she and HMS Hector left on a cruise during which at some point they pursued two French frigates. They captured a French merchant ship, Etoille du Matin, on 23 February. They returned on 4 March. They then were fitted for service in the West Indies and on 24 March, left with the fleet under Rear-Admiral Sir Alan Gardner. Hannibal returned to Britain in early 1794, and underwent fitting at Plymouth from March to December.

Captain John Markham took command of Hannibal in August 1794. On 10 April 1795, Rear-Admiral Colpoys, while cruising with a squadron composed of five ships of the line and three frigates, chased three French frigates. HMS Colossus got within gunshot of one of them and opened fire, at which the frigates took different courses. HMS Robust and Hannibal pursued two; the 32-gun fifth-rate frigate HMS Astraea pursued and captured the 36-gun Gloire after an hour-long fight at the action of 10 April 1795. The next day Hannibal captured the 32-gun French frigate Gentille, but Fraternité escaped. Gentille lost eight men killed and fifteen wounded; Hannibal had four men wounded. The Royal Navy took Gentille into service. (Note: The Royal Navy never commissioned Gentille. Instead she became a receiving ship at Portsmouth and was sold in 1802.)

Ten British warships, Hannibal being one of them, shared in the proceeds of the recapture of the Caldicot Castle on 28 March 1795, and the capture on 30 March, of the French privateer corvette Jean Bart. (The Navy took Jean Bart into service as Arab.)

On 14 May 1795, Hannibal sailed for Jamaica. On 21 October, while on the West Indies station, Hannibal captured the 8-gun French privateer schooner Grand Voltigeur. Three days later she captured the 12-gun French privateer Convention. On 13 November, she captured the French privateer Petit Tonnerre. Markham left Hannibal in December.

His successor, in January 1796, was Captain T. Lewis. On 27 January 1796, Hannibal and HMS Sampson captured the privateer Alerte. Alerte was armed with 14 guns and Sampson was the actual captor.

Captain Robert Campbell assumed command in April 1798. Captain Edward Tyrrell Smith followed him in October, and remained in command until 1800, when Captain John Loring replaced him, only to pay Hannibal off later that year.

On 17 August 1798, Hannibal's crew impressed six sailors from the American sloop Lark, one of whom later deserted.

== Defeat and loss ==
Captain Solomon Ferris commissioned Hannibal in March 1801, and under his command she sailed from Spithead on 6 June 1801. She joined Rear-Admiral Sir James Saumarez in Cawsand Bay on 12 June, ready to sail for the Mediterranean.

On the morning of 6 July, Saumarez's squadron of six line-of-battle ships attacked French Admiral Linois's three line-of-battle ships and a frigate in Algeciras Bay. Hannibal was the last in and she anchored ahead of HMS Caesar, Saumarez's flagship. From there she fired broadsides for about an hour. At about 10 o'clock Saumarez ordered Hannibal to cut her cables and move to support HMS Pompee by engaging Formidable, Linois's flagship. As Hannibal maneuvered, the variable winds pushed her into shoal water and she grounded. Still, from his immobile position, Ferris maintained fire on Formidable with those of his forward guns that could bear on her; the other guns fired at the town, batteries and gunboats. Saumarez sent boats from Caesar and HMS Venerable to assist Hannibal but a shot demolished Caesar's pinnace; Ferris then used one of his own cutters to send them back to Caesar. At about 1:30pm the British ships withdrew to Gibraltar, leaving Hannibal immobile and unsupported.

Ferris consulted with his officers and decided that further resistance was pointless; the only way to save the lives of the remaining crew was for Hannibal to strike. By this point Hannibal's fire had dwindled to almost nothing so Ferris ordered his men to shelter below decks. He then signaled capitulation by hoisting Hannibal's ensign upside down. The battle had cost Hannibal 75 men killed, 62 wounded and six missing.

Commander George Dundas, deceived by a signal from Hannibal, sent boats from HMS Calpe to save Hannibal's crew. The French detained the boats and their crews, including Calpe's lieutenant, T. Sykes; after firing several broadsides at the enemy's shipping and batteries, Calpe returned to Gibraltar. The French and Spanish were unable to repair Hannibal quickly enough for her to take part in the eventual defeat of the Franco-Spanish squadron at the Second Battle of Algeciras several days later.

Sir James Saumarez then arranged to exchange the men from Saint Antoine, which the British had captured in the second part of the battle, for the men from Hannibal and Calpe. A court martial in HMS Gladiator in Portsmouth on 1 September, honourably acquitted Captain Ferris, his officers and crew for the loss of their ship.

== French service ==
The French renamed Hannibal as Annibal. In November 1801, HMS Racoon convoyed the Straits fleet to Gibraltar, arriving there on 16 November. On the way they encountered dreadful weather in the Bay of Biscay. While Racoon was near Brest, she observed Hannibal and Speedy underway. Both former Royal Navy vessels were under jury-masts and French colours. Later, on 9 February 1802, Annibal (along with Intrépide and Formidable), sailed from Cádiz for Toulon where she underwent a refit between March and June.

Annibal then served in the French Navy until 1821, undergoing a further refit at Toulon during 1809. She was partly re-armed in 1806, with one pair of upper deck guns being removed, and sixteen 32-pounder carronades replacing ten of her 9-pounder guns. In May 1807, the 38-gun frigate HMS Spartan encountered Annibal, two frigates (Pomone and Incorruptible), and the corvette Victorieuse off Cabrera in the Mediterranean but escaped.

== Fate ==
In January 1821, Annibal became a hulk at Toulon, and was broken up in 1824.

== See also ==
- List of ships captured in the 19th century
