= Charles du Houx, Marquis of Vioménil =

Marshal of France (1734–1827)

Charles Joseph Hyacinthe du Houx, Marquis of Vioménil
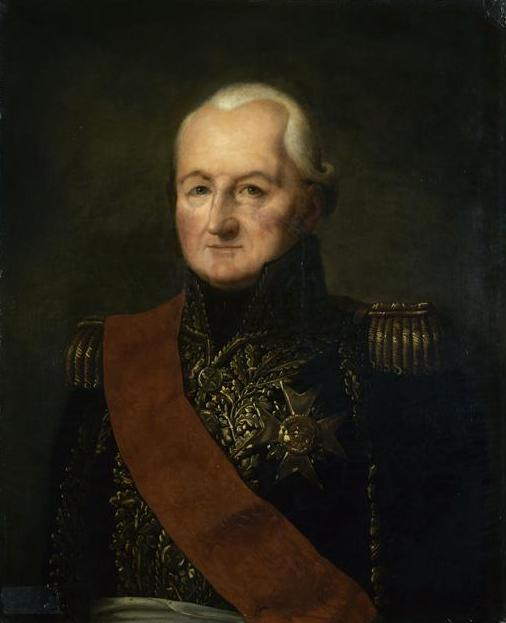

Governor general of the Windward Islands & Governor of Martinique (acting)
- In office July 1789 – April 1790
- Preceded by: Claude-Charles de Damas de Marillac
- Succeeded by: Jean-Pierre-Antoine de Béhague

Personal details
- Born: 22 August 1734 Ruppes, France
- Died: 5 March 1827 (aged 92) Paris, France
- Occupation: Soldier

Military service
- Allegiance: Kingdom of France; Armée des émigrés
- Branch/service: Army
- Battles/wars: War of the Austrian Succession; Seven Years' War; American Revolutionary War

Charles du Houx, Marquis of Vioménil (Charles Joseph Hyacinthe; August 22, 1734 – March 5, 1827) was a Marshal of France. Viomesnil entered the French army at age 13 as a lieutenant of the regiment of Limousin. He served in the War of the Austrian Succession where he took part in the Battle of Lauffeld and the capture of Bergen op Zoom. During the Seven Years' War he served as an aide de camp to general François de Chevert (1757–1758). Viomesnil was made a knight of the Order of Saint Louis in 1760. He was promoted to colonel in 1761. In 1768 he commanded an infantry brigade during the annexation of Corsica. Upon his return to France in 1769 he was made colonel of the Légion de Lorraine en 1770.

Promoted maréchal de camp in 1780, Viomesnil served under Rochambeau in America during the Yorktown campaign. After his return from the American Revolutionary War he was made inspector-general of the cavalry (1783–1788). In 1789–1790 he served as governor of Martinique.

After the outbreak of the French Revolution in 1791 Viomesnil decided to emigrate and join the army of Condé. In 1798 he entered Russian service and with the rank of lieutenant-general he commanded an army in Lithuania. Originally designated to command the Russian forces sent to Italy he was replaced by Alexander Suvorov and sent instead to Jersey and Guernsey in anticipation of a joined invasion of France. When the Russian troops returned home, Viomesnil went to Portugal but had to leave Portugal in 1803 upon the demand of the French ambassador Jean Lannes.

After the Bourbon Restoration in 1814 Viomesnil was a made a Peer of France. During the Hundred Days he followed Louis XVIII to Ghent. After Waterloo and the Second Restoration, he was given command of a military division centered at Bordeaux. In 1816 at age 82 he was made a Marshal of France, the next year he was made a marquis. in 1820 he was given the Order du Saint-Esprit and in 1823 he was made an Officer in the Légion d'honneur.

== Sources ==
- Louis de La Roque, Catalogue historique des généraux français, Paris, 1902
