= French frigate Gentille (1778) =

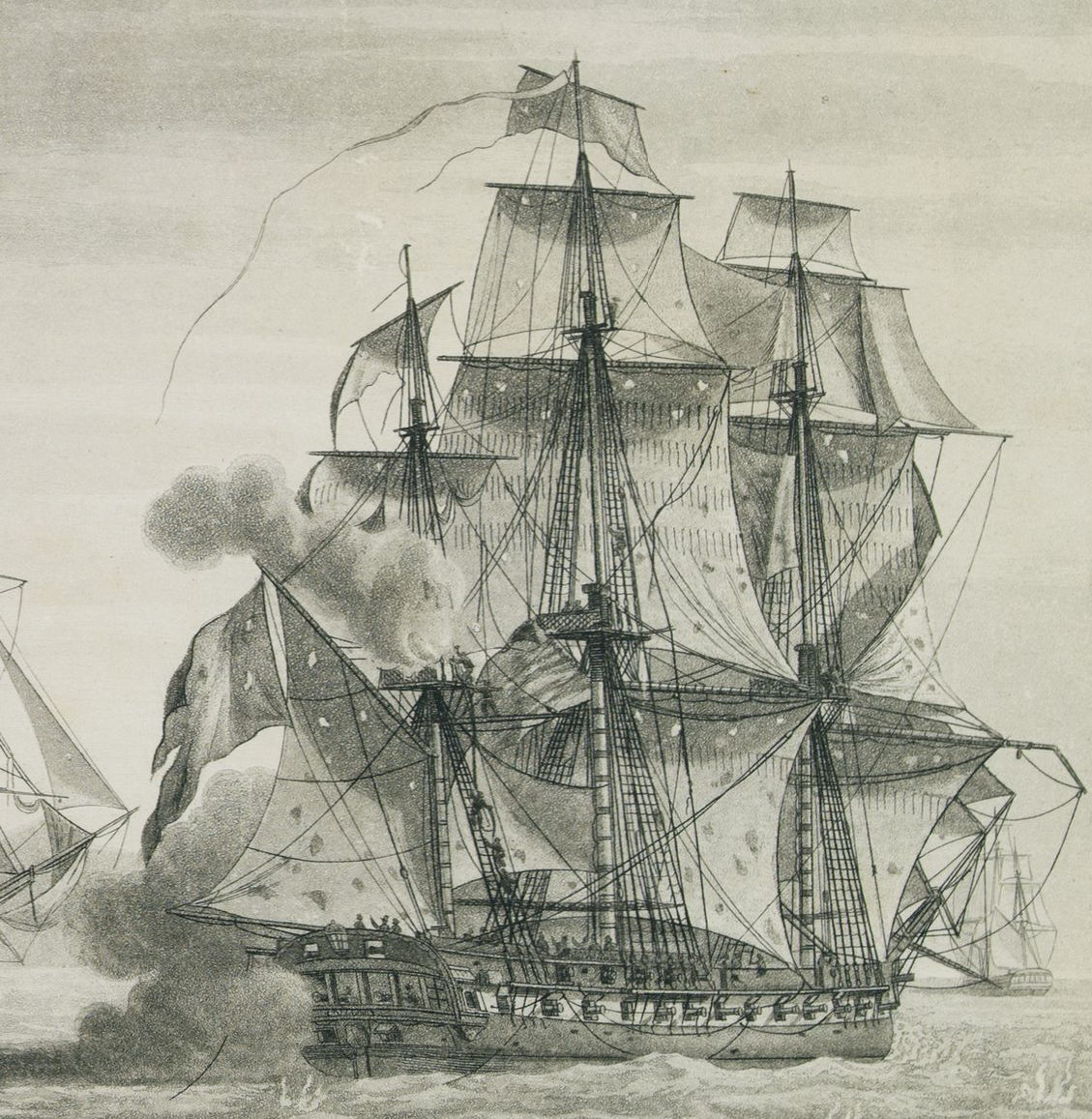
- Bellone, Gentille's sister ship

History

France
- Name: Gentille
- Namesake: "nice"
- Ordered: 17 August 1779
- Builder: Saint-Malo
- Laid down: July 1777
- Launched: 18 June 1778
- In service: August 1778
- Captured: 11 April 1795

General characteristics
- Class & type: Iphigénie-class frigate
- Displacement: 1,150 tonneaux
- Tons burthen: 620 port tonneaux
- Length: 44.2 metres
- Beam: 11.2 metres
- Sail plan: Full-rigged ship
- Armament: 32 guns

Gentille was a 32-gun Iphigénie-class frigate of the French Navy.

== French service ==
In 1779, Gentille was under Mengaud de la Haye. On 17 August 1779, she and Junon, under Bernard de Marigny, captured the 64-gun HMS Ardent.

On 26 April 1780, Gentille and Iphigénie captured HMS Fortune off Barbuda. The frigates belonged to Guichen’s squadron.

On 19 February 1781, in Chesapeake Bay, Gentille along with the 64-gun Eveillé, the frigate Surveillante, and the cutter Guêpe. captured the 44-gun HMS Romulus, In September, she ferried troops from Annapolis to the James River to support the Siege of Yorktown.

During the War of the First Coalition, Gentille cruised the Atlantic under Lieutenant Canon. She was captured by the 74-gun HMS Hannibal and Robust in the action of 10 April 1795.

== Fate ==
Gentille was broken up in 1802.
