= John Colpoys =

Royal Navy officer (1742–1821)

Admiral Sir John Colpoys GCB
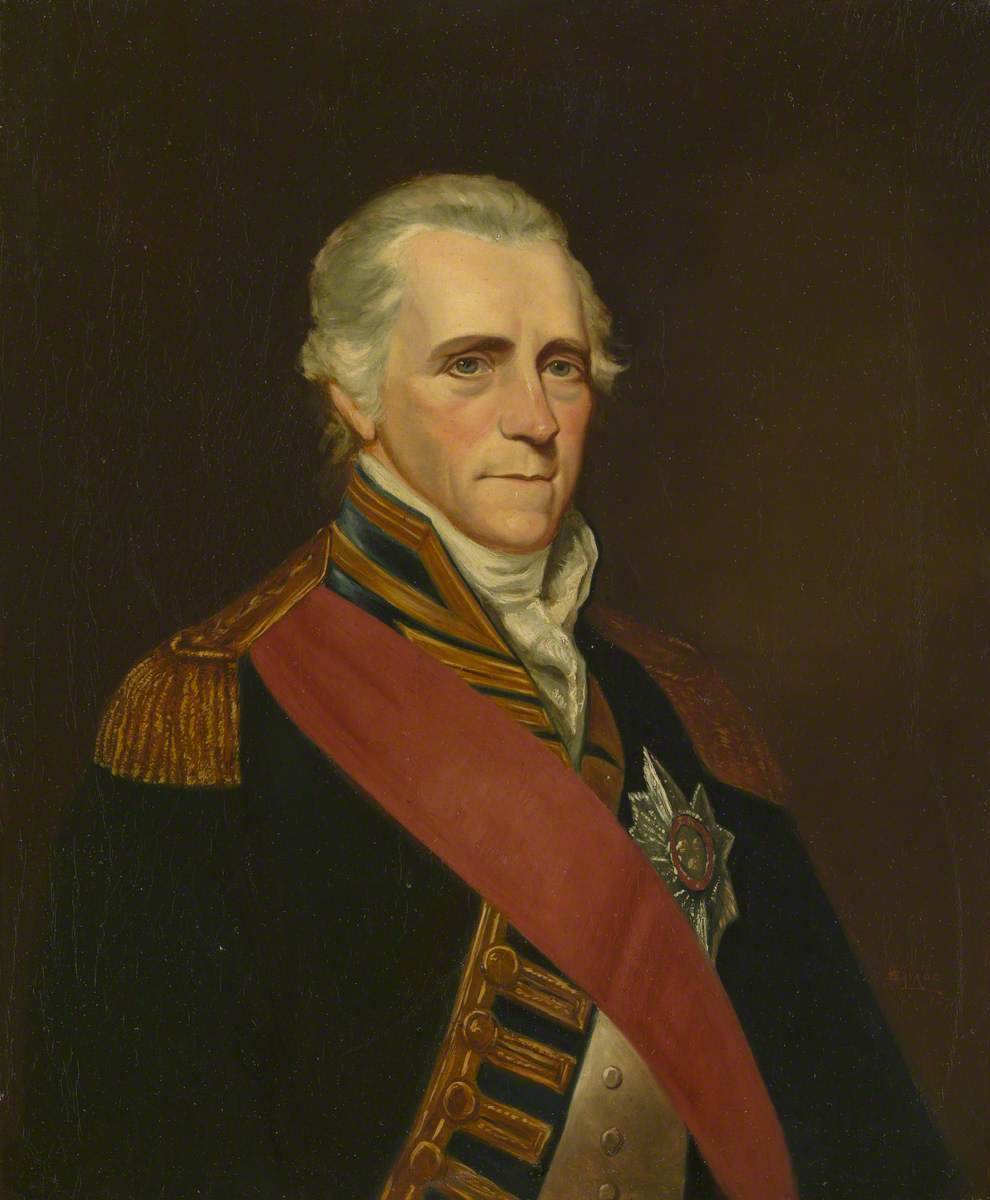
- Portrait by W. Savage, 1871
- Born: c. 1742
- Died: 4 April 1821; Greenwich Hospital, London
- Military career
- Allegiance: Great Britain; United Kingdom
- Branch: Royal Navy
- Service years: 1756–1821
- Rank: Admiral
- Commands: Plymouth Command; Greenwich Hospital
- Conflicts: Seven Years' War; Siege of Louisbourg (1758); Invasion of Martinique (1762); American War of Independence; French Revolutionary Wars; Napoleonic Wars

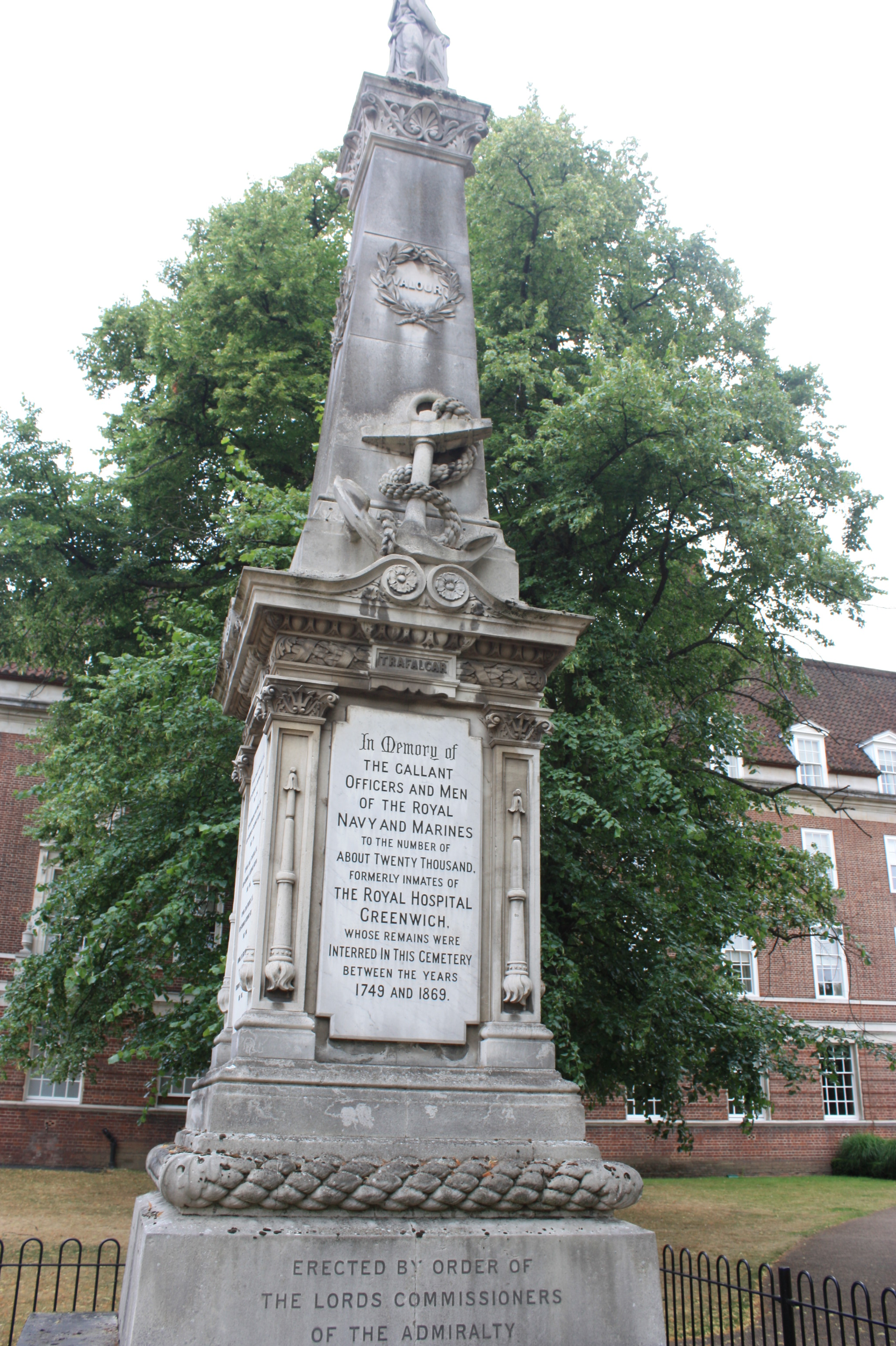
The Officers Monument, Greenwich Hospital Cemetery

Admiral Sir John Colpoys, GCB (c. 1742 – 4 April 1821) was a Royal Navy officer who served in three wars but is most notable for being one of the catalysts of the Spithead Mutiny in 1797 after ordering his marines to fire on a deputation of mutinous sailors. Although this event resulted in his removal from active duty, Colpoys was a capable administrator who remained heavily involved in staff duties ashore during the Napoleonic Wars and was later a Lord of the Admiralty, Knight Companion of the Order of the Bath (later a Knight Grand Cross) and Governor of Greenwich Naval Hospital.

== Early career ==
Colpoys was the son of John Colpoys, a Dublin attorney and Registrar to Chief Justice William Yorke. His mother was a Miss Madden whose mother was Anne, daughter of Edward Singleton, an alderman of Drogheda in Ireland. Singleton's son, Henry, was Chief Justice of the Common Pleas in Ireland from 1740 to 1753, while his granddaughter Charity, daughter of his son Rowland, was the wife of William Yorke, who succeeded Henry Singleton as Chief Justice of the Common Pleas in Ireland in 1753. Nothing is known of Colpoys' birth or childhood, except that he was born in approximately 1742. He is believed to have entered the Royal Navy in 1756 at the outbreak of the Seven Years' War and certainly served in the Siege of Louisbourg in 1758 and the British expedition against Martinique four years later. His service in these campaigns was not especially notable, but they were to be almost his only experience of action with the enemy. While serving at Martinique, Colpoys was promoted to lieutenant and in 1770 received his first command, the small frigate HMS Lynx. Promoted commander the same year, he was again promoted in 1773, becoming a post captain in command of the ship of the line HMS Northumberland.

At the outbreak of the American War of Independence, Colpoys took command of the frigate HMS Seaford, which he commanded in European waters without seeing any significant action. In 1778, shortly after leaving the frigate, Colpoys was called to an Admiralty court as a judge in the court-martial of Sir Hugh Palliser in the acrimonious aftermath of the First Battle of Ushant. As instructed, the court found Palliser innocent of any wrongdoing and Colpoys returned to sea as commander of HMS Orpheus on the North American Station. In Orpheus, Colpoys achieved his one victory at sea when, in company with HMS Roebuck, he ran down and captured the small frigate USS Confederacy in 1781. His final command of the war was HMS Phoebe, a frigate with the Mediterranean Fleet that was paid off a few months after he joined her in 1783.

== French Revolutionary Wars ==
After seven years on half-pay, Colpoys was recalled in 1790 to command the guardship HMS Hannibal at Portsmouth. With the renewal of conflict with France in 1793 in the French Revolutionary Wars, Colpoys was recalled to active service as a squadron commander under Alan Gardner in the Channel and subsequently the West Indies. In April 1794, Colpoys was promoted to rear-admiral and flew his flag in HMS London with the Channel Fleet under Lord Bridport, with his nephew Edward Griffith as his flag captain. In 1795, London was present but not engaged at the Battle of Groix, and later at the action of 10 April 1795.

Ordered to command the blockade squadron off Brest in the winter of 1796, Colpoys was driven offshore by gales and detached a squadron of frigates under Sir Edward Pellew to watch the port. On 16 December, the French attempted to escape at dusk, the Brest fleet carrying an army intended for the invasion of Ireland. Although Pellew spotted the attempt and tried to divert the French during the night, the majority of the French forces reached the Atlantic safely. Rather than pursue the French, Colpoys took his ships into Plymouth for a refit while the main body of the Channel Fleet hunted for the invasion force. The expedition was eventually foiled by a combination of disorganisation and severe gales.

=== Spithead Mutiny ===
Colpoys most notable action during his naval service occurred in 1797, after the outbreak of the Spithead Mutiny in April. Disaffected sailors in the Channel Fleet at Spithead went on strike, demanding a number of concessions before they would return to offensive operations. Although all but four ships returned to service within days following negotiations with the Admiralty, tensions were still running high. The four ships that refused to sail were all placed under Colpoys's command while the remainder of the fleet were taken to St Helens, Isle of Wight to isolate the mutinous ships. On 1 May, an order from the Admiralty arrived with the fleet ordering officers to use violent methods to break the mutiny and to arrest its ringleaders. Aware that the order would provoke a recurrence of the original mutiny, many officers attempted to stifle news of the order, but without success.

The crews at St. Helens once again rose against their officers, and Colpoys at Spithead took urgent steps to ensure the loyalty of his own crew on HMS London. The sailors were called on deck and asked to air any grievances they might have; the crew replied that they had none, and Colpoys dismissed them. Worried about the potential influence of mutineers from the fleet at St. Helens, Colpoys then attempted to isolate his crew by sealing them below decks. This infuriated the men, who demanded an audience with the admiral. Colpoys refused to allow their delegates on deck, and the crew attempted to storm the hatches. Colpoys panicked, and ordered his officers and marines to open fire on the sailors climbing out of the hatches. Although most of the marines refused the order, a number of sailors were killed before Colpoys brought an end to the gunfire.

Outnumbered by his now thoroughly mutinous crew, Colpoys was forced to surrender. Taking full responsibility for the shooting, to spare one of his officers threatened with hanging for shooting a sailor, Colpoys and his fellow officers were seized and imprisoned, while London sailed to St. Helens to join the fleet. Although the crew originally planned to try Colpoys and his officers for the shooting, they were all later released ashore. Colpoys was later explicitly named in the mutineer's demands as an officer they would refuse to serve under. Colpoys was removed from active service at this time, although this may not have been a condemnation of his actions: he had already requested to be relieved before the mutiny due to his deteriorating health.

== Shore service ==
No longer serving at sea, Colpoys began to recover his health and was rewarded for his long service in 1798 with appointment as a Knight Companion of the Order of the Bath. Remaining in semi-retirement, Colpoys was promoted to full admiral in 1801, and recalled by the Admiralty in 1803 to be the Commander-in-Chief, Plymouth. The following year, Lord Melville specifically requested Colpoys to serve as a Lord of the Admiralty and he was also considered for the post of commander-in-chief of the Mediterranean Fleet, although this was eventually awarded to Cuthbert Collingwood.

In 1805, Colpoys was awarded the honorary position of treasurer of Greenwich Hospital, and in 1816 he became governor of that institution. In the preceding year at the reformation of the orders of chivalry, Colpoys had become a Knight Grand Cross of the Order of the Bath.

In 1821, Colpoys died at the Greenwich Hospital aged 79, and was buried on the site. He is listed on the south face of the Officers Monument there.

== See also the vessels ==
- Colpoys
- Admiral Colpoys

Military offices
Preceded by Sir James Dacres	Commander-in-Chief, Plymouth; 1803–1804	Succeeded by Sir William Young
Preceded by Viscount Hood	Governor, Greenwich Hospital; 1816–1821	Succeeded by Sir Richard Keats
