= James Richard Dacres (Royal Navy officer, born 1749) =

Royal Navy officer (1749–1810)

Vice-Admiral James Richard Dacres
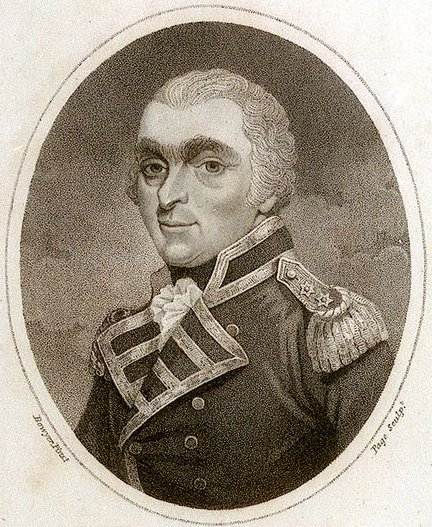
- Born: February 1749; Gibraltar
- Died: 6 January 1810 (aged 60)
- Relatives: James Richard Dacres (son); Barrington Dacres (son); Richard Dacres (brother)
- Military career
- Allegiance: Kingdom of Great Britain; United Kingdom of Great Britain and Ireland
- Branch: Royal Navy
- Service years: 1762 – 1810
- Rank: Vice-Admiral
- Commands: HMS Sylph; HMS Ceres; HMS Sultan; HMS Maidstone; HMS Perseus; HMS Orpheus; HMS Aurora; HMS Sceptre; HMS Barfleur; HMS Foudroyant; Jamaica Station; Plymouth Command
- Conflicts: Battle of Valcour Island; Battle of Groix; Battle of Cape St Vincent

James Richard Dacres (February 1749 – 6 January 1810) was an officer of the Royal Navy who saw service during the Seven Years' War, the American War of Independence and the French Revolutionary and Napoleonic Wars. He eventually rose to the rank of Vice-Admiral.

== Family and early life ==
Dacres was born in Gibraltar in February 1749, the eldest son of the secretary of the garrison Richard Dacres, and his wife Mary Dacres, née Bateman. He had a younger brother, Richard Dacres, who also embarked on a naval career. James Richard entered the navy in February 1762, joining the 28-gun frigate HMS Active, which was then under the command of Captain Herbert Sawyer. Shortly afterwards, on 21 May that year, the Active in company with HMS Favourite captured the Spanish register ship Hermione. The Hermione had been bound from Lima carrying a cargo of gold coin, gold, silver and tin ingots, and cocoa and when captured became the richest prize taken during the war. The Active's share of the prize money came to £251,020 12s, which meant that even an ordinary seaman received the sum of £485 3s 4d. Dacres moved aboard Captain William Hotham's 32-gun HMS Aeolus, following this with service aboard Captain John Elliot's HMS Thames and Commodore Richard Spry's 60-gun HMS Jersey. Spry appointed Dacres as lieutenant to the 32-gun HMS Montreal under Captain Phillips Cosby on 17 March 1769.

== American War of Independence ==
With the outbreak of the war Dacres was appointed as second lieutenant aboard the 32-gun HMS Blonde, under Captain Philemon Pownoll. He sailed with the Blonde to Quebec as part of the escort for a troop convoy. In June 1776 he was appointed by Commodore Sir Charles Douglas to lead a naval detachment to Lake Champlain. There he took command of the 12-gun schooner Carleton, which formed part of Captain Thomas Pringle's flotilla. He took part in the Battle of Valcour Island on 11 October 1776 and after the victory General Guy Carleton sent Dacres back to Britain with the despatches. He was made master and commander on 25 November 1776 after his return and was appointed to command the 14-gun HMS Sylph. He transferred to the 18-gun HMS Ceres and commanded her off the Leeward Islands.

Ceres patrolled the Caribbean and the American coasts, and on 9 March 1778 and in company with HMS Ariadne she chased two American frigates, USS Alfred and USS Raleigh, eventually engaging the Alfred and forcing her to surrender. He went on to capture the French privateer Tigre on 18 October 1778; but the Ceres was herself engaged and captured by the 36-gun French frigate Iphigénie off St Lucia on 17 December 1778. The Ceres was escorting a troop convoy at the time, and Dacres acted to decoy the French frigate away from the convoy, eventually forcing the French to pursue the Ceres for 48 hours, allowing the convoy to escape. Dacres was subsequently exchanged and returned to England, whereupon he was made acting-captain of the 74-gun HMS Sultan, afterwards being transferred to the 28-gun HMS Maidstone. He was not confirmed as post-captain however until 13 September 1780, when he was given command of the 20-gun HMS Perseus, stationed in the Downs. He transferred to the frigates HMS Orpheus and HMS Aurora towards the end of the war.

== French Revolutionary Wars ==
The outbreak of the French Revolutionary Wars in 1793 led to Dacres returning to sea aboard the 64-gun HMS Sceptre and taking part in the bombardment and capture of Fort Bizothen at Port-au-Prince. His crew however suffered from high levels of sickness and Dacres was despatched back to Britain as a convoy escort. After his arrival he was appointed to command the 90-gun HMS Barfleur as part of the Channel Fleet under Lord Bridport. He was present at the Battle of Groix on 23 June 1795, but was not actively engaged.

Vice-Admiral William Waldegrave went on to hoist his flag on the Barfleur, retaining Dacres as his flag captain. He and the Barfleur sailed to join Sir John Jervis's fleet in the Mediterranean. Dacres was involved in the recapture of HMS Nemesis from the French in early 1796, and was still in command when the Battle of Cape St Vincent took place on 14 February 1797. Dacres subsequently returned to Britain aboard the hired cutter Flora and received command of the 80-gun HMS Foudroyant, sailing her to the Mediterranean. Dacres remained aboard the Foudroyant until February 1799.

== Flag rank ==
Dacres was promoted to Rear-Admiral of the Blue on 14 February 1799, two years to the day after the battle of Cape St Vincent. He was further advanced to Rear-Admiral of the White on 1 January 1801, and was then appointed as second in command of the Plymouth command. With the Peace of Amiens he became Commander-in-Chief, Plymouth. With the resumption of the war he was appointed second in command on the Jamaica Station, serving under Sir John Thomas Duckworth and flying his flag in the 36-gun Franchise. He soon became considerably wealthy from the spoils of prize warfare, being appointed commander of the station in late 1804, promoted to vice admiral on 9 November 1805 and remaining in the post until 1808.

== Family and later life ==
Dacres had married Eleanor Blandford Pearce, of Cambridge, on 1 August 1777 during a period in Britain while in command of the Ceres. The marriage took place at Totnes, Devon and subsequently produced two sons. Both had substantial naval careers, the elder, Barrington Dacres became post-captain, the younger, James Richard Dacres rose to be a Vice-Admiral. Dacres retired from active service in 1809 having amassed considerable wealth from his time in Jamaica. He did not live long to enjoy it though, dying on 6 January 1810 at the age of 60 after a fall from his horse.

== Notes ==
Military offices
Preceded by Sir Thomas Pasley	Commander-in-Chief, Plymouth; 1802–1803	Succeeded by Sir John Colpoys
Preceded by Sir John Duckworth	Commander-in-Chief, Jamaica Station; 1804–1808	Succeeded by Bartholomew Rowley
