= List of Chatan Town cultural and natural assets =

List of cultural and natural assets in Chatan Town, distributed in

- tangible cultural properties and monuments,
- gusukus and
- archaeological sites.

Chatan Town currently includes eight tangible cultural properties and monuments, designated or registered at the national or municipal level, two identified gusukus and sixty-one archaeological sites.

== Designated or registered tangible cultural properties and monuments ==
=== Cultural Properties ===
==== Chatan Uchinā-yā Residence ====
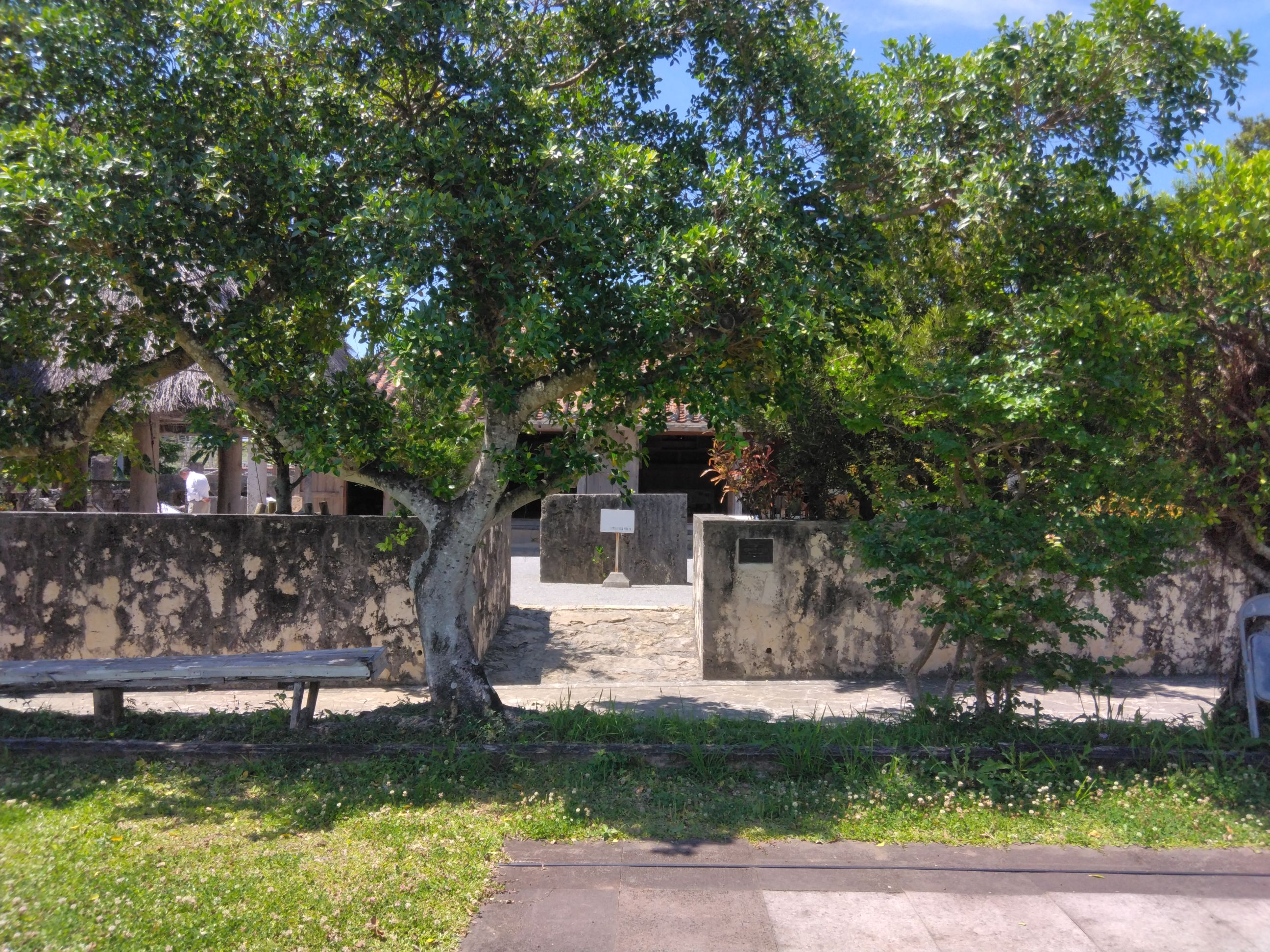
Chatan Uchinā-yā seen from outside

Address: 904-0101 Chatan, Aza Kamisedo 830-2 (loc. 26.32795°N 127.76830°E)

Chatan Uchinā-yā (lit. "the Okinawan house of Chatan") is a complex including components moved from diverse locations and restored to recreate a traditional Ryūkyūan residence. It comprises the main house of the former Medoruma Residence and the pigpen latrines (fūru) of the former Sakihara Residence, as well as a raised floor storehouse, a sugar cane press and a well.

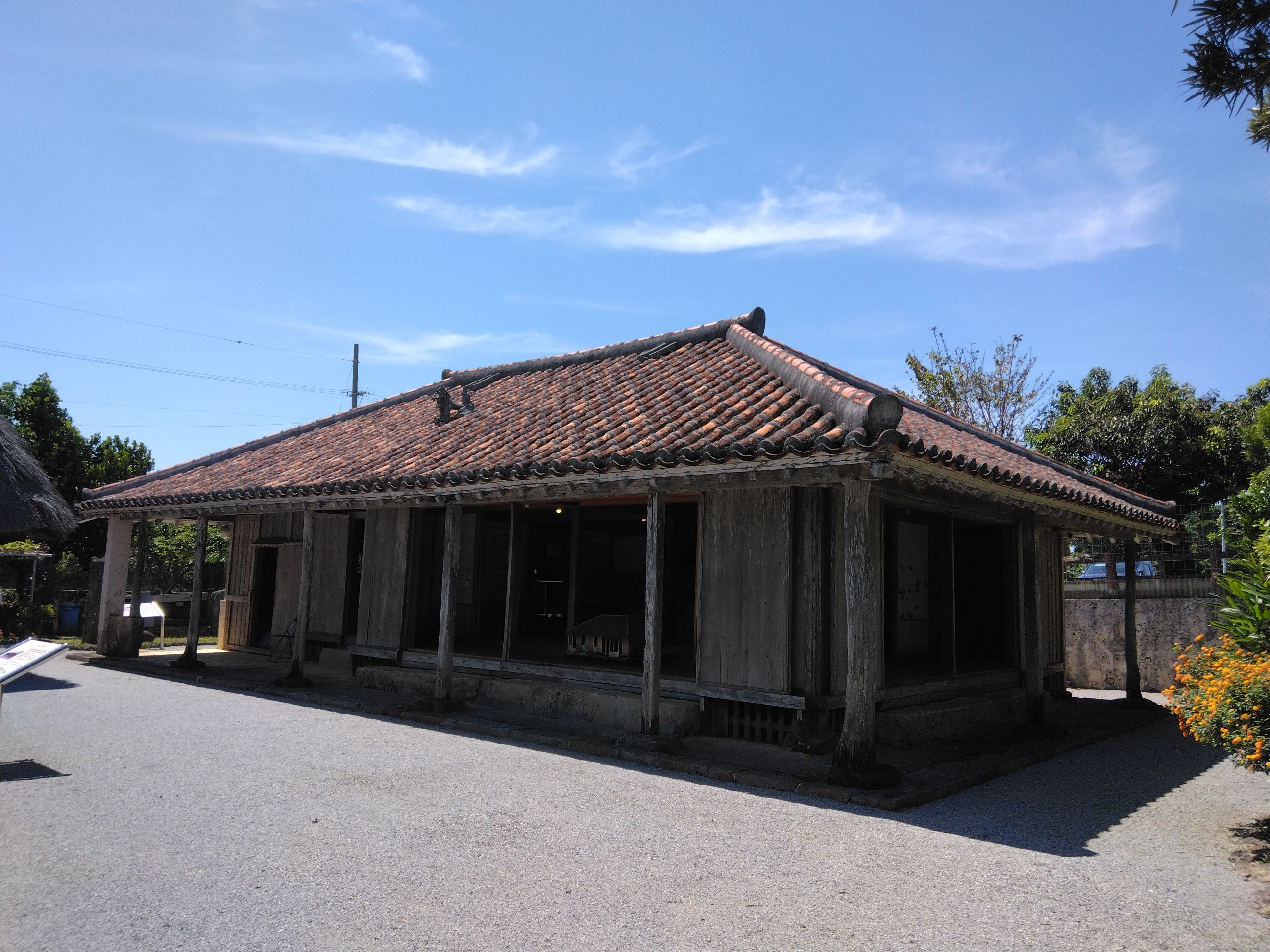
Main building of Chatan Uchinā-yā

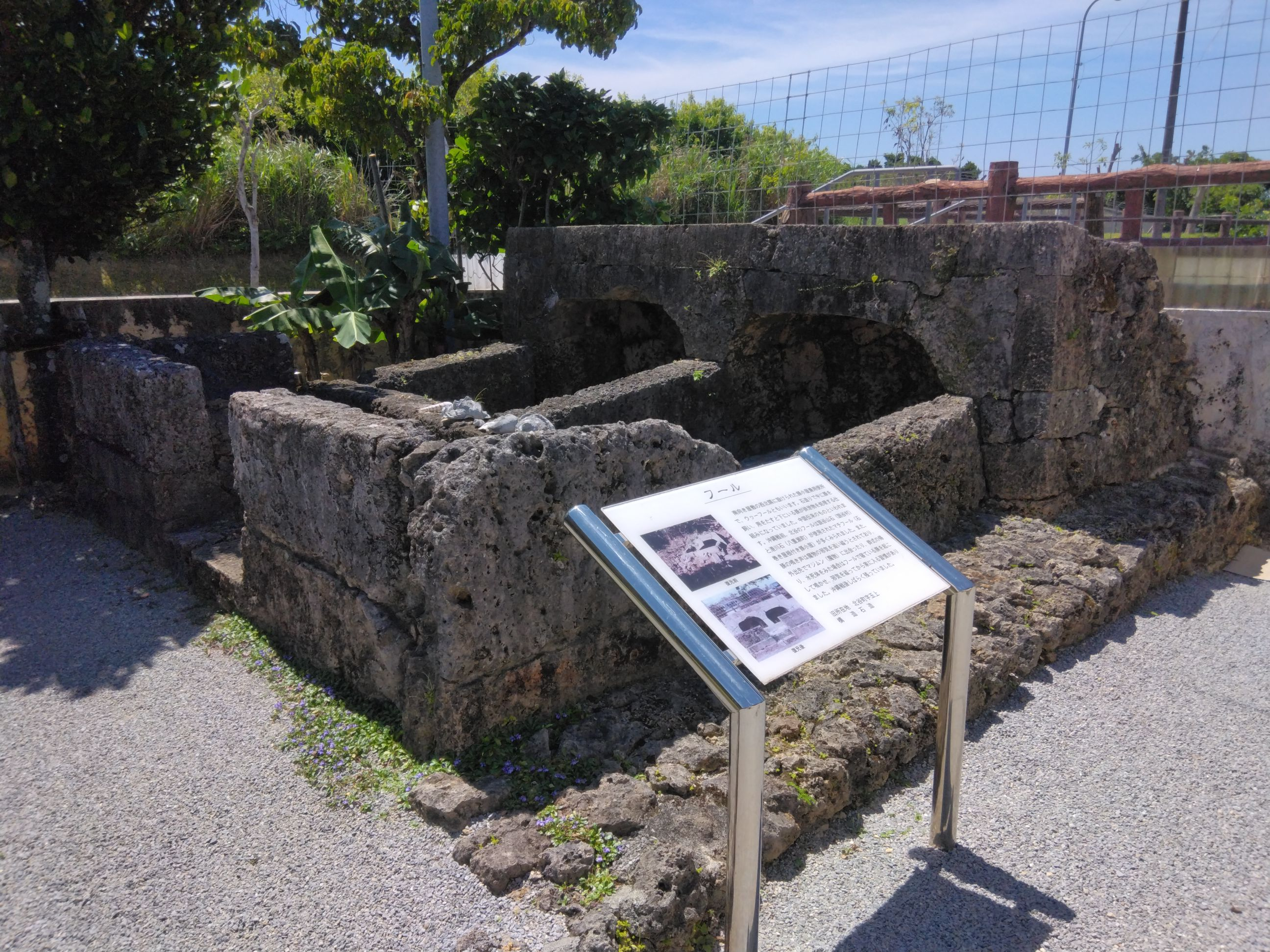
Pigpen latrines of Chatan Uchinā-yā

The main house and the fūru were registered as National Cultural Properties in February 2012 under the names "Chatan Uchinā-yā Residence main house, former Medoruma Residence main house" (Japanese: 北谷町うちなぁ家主屋 旧目取真家住宅主屋) and "Chatan Uchinā-yā Residence pigpen latrines, former Sakihara Residence pig pen latrines" (Japanese: 北谷町うちなぁ家ふーる 旧崎原家住宅ふーる)

The main house of the Medoruma Residence was donated to the Board of Education of Chatan by the family in 1993. It is a wooden building covered with red tiles that had been built in 1890. It was moved in 2005 from its original site in Aza Yoshihara (Chatan Town) to its current location and renovated. It covers 104 square metres and is constructed according to the rules defined by the Ryūkyū Kingdom administration concerning residences (Law on the Limitations for Residential Areas and Houses 敷地家屋の制限令, 1737): the size of the houses and of each room was fixed in accordance to the rank of the owner (no more than six tatami mats per room for a commoner’s house). Tile covering was also prohibited for commoners until the abrogation of the law in 1889.
The house has a residential part on the east composed of two main rooms and a back room (ichibanzā, nibanzā and kucha) and a kitchen on the west.

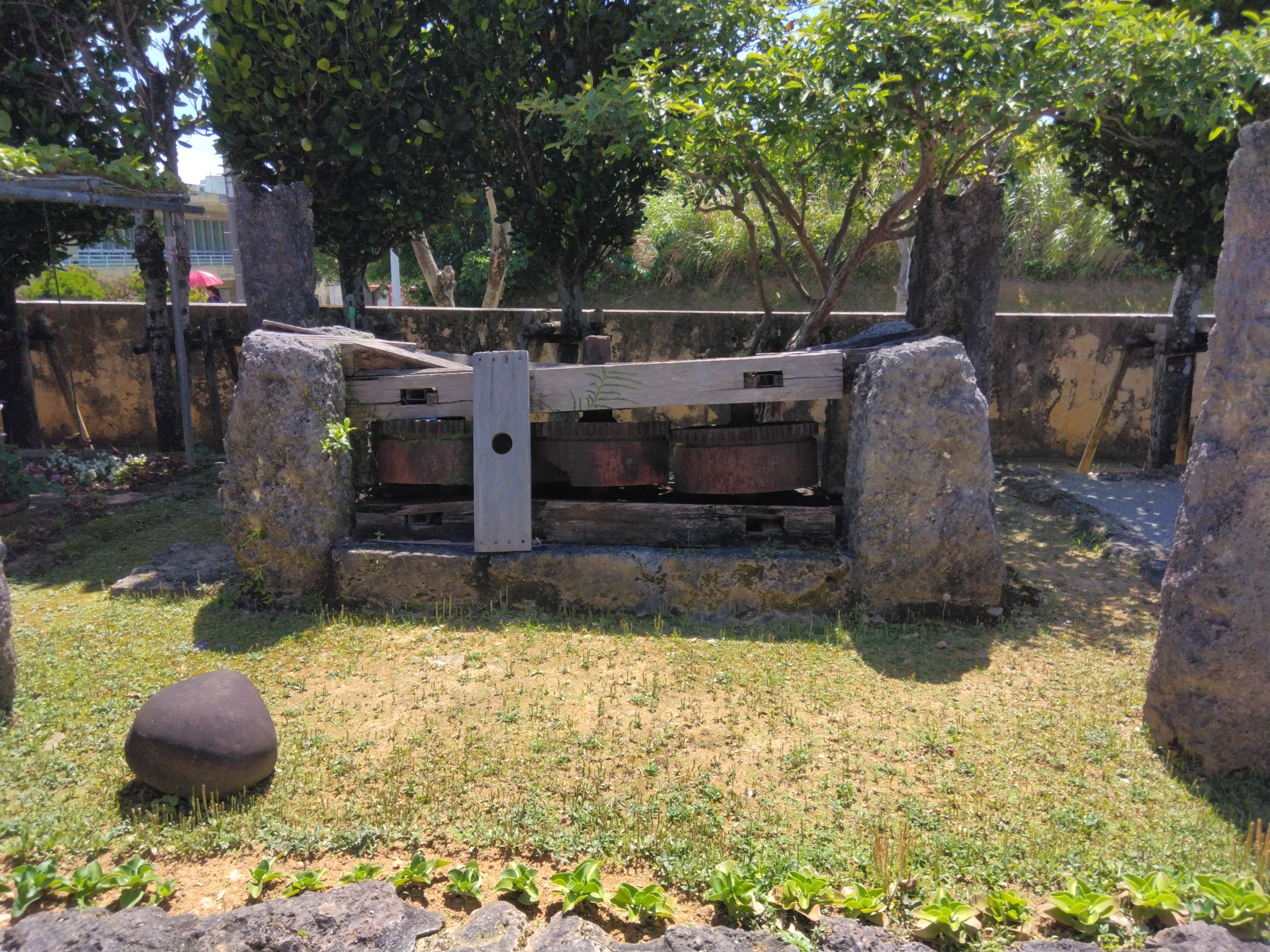
Sugar cane press of Chatan Uchinā-yā

The pigpen latrines (fūru / uwāfūru) used to be in the Sakihama Residence in Aza Tamagami (Chatan Town). They have been placed in the northwestern corner of the residence, as they used to be traditionally. They are built and paved in limestone and include two pigpens with arched roofs on the back.

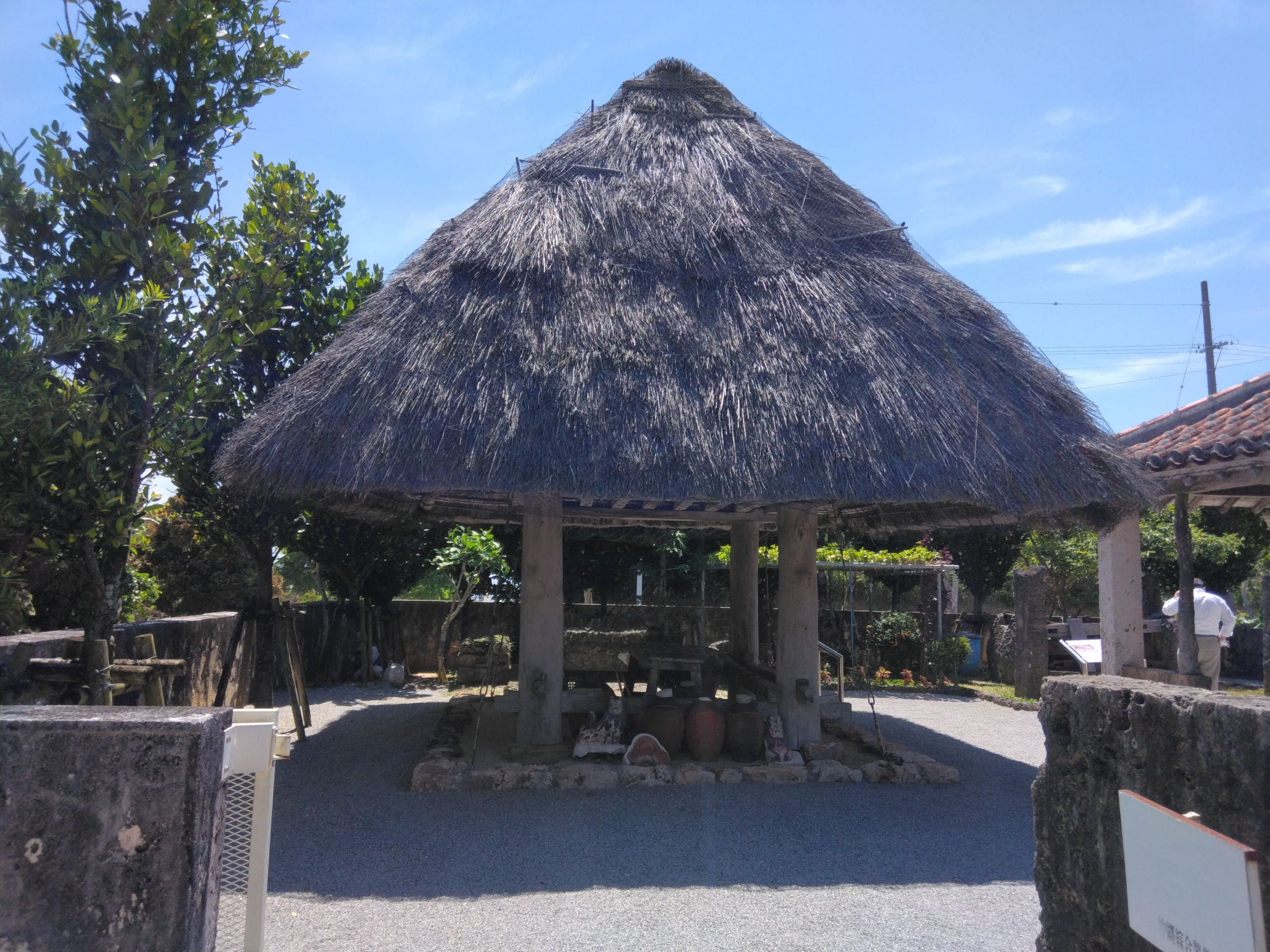
Raised floor granary of Chatan Uchinā-yā

The foundations of the sugar cane press are also made in stone, and its iron wheels date back to the 1880’s. It was used until after WWII. An evocation of a traditional cattle house, with four stone pillars, is located in front of the sugar cane press. The structure would at the time have been covered by a thatched roof and have had several wooden partitions.

The raised floor storehouse was originally in Amami (Man’ya in Kasari Town). All the storehouses of Chatan were burnt down during WWII so that it was not possible to obtain one from the town.

Only the residence and the fūru are currently registered as National Cultural Properties.

==== Chibu-gā Spring ====
Address: 904-0107 Chatan, Aza Ōmura (loc. 26.30529°N 127.77213°E)

Chibu-gā Spring (Japanese: ちぶ川) is designated as a tangible cultural property at the municipal level.

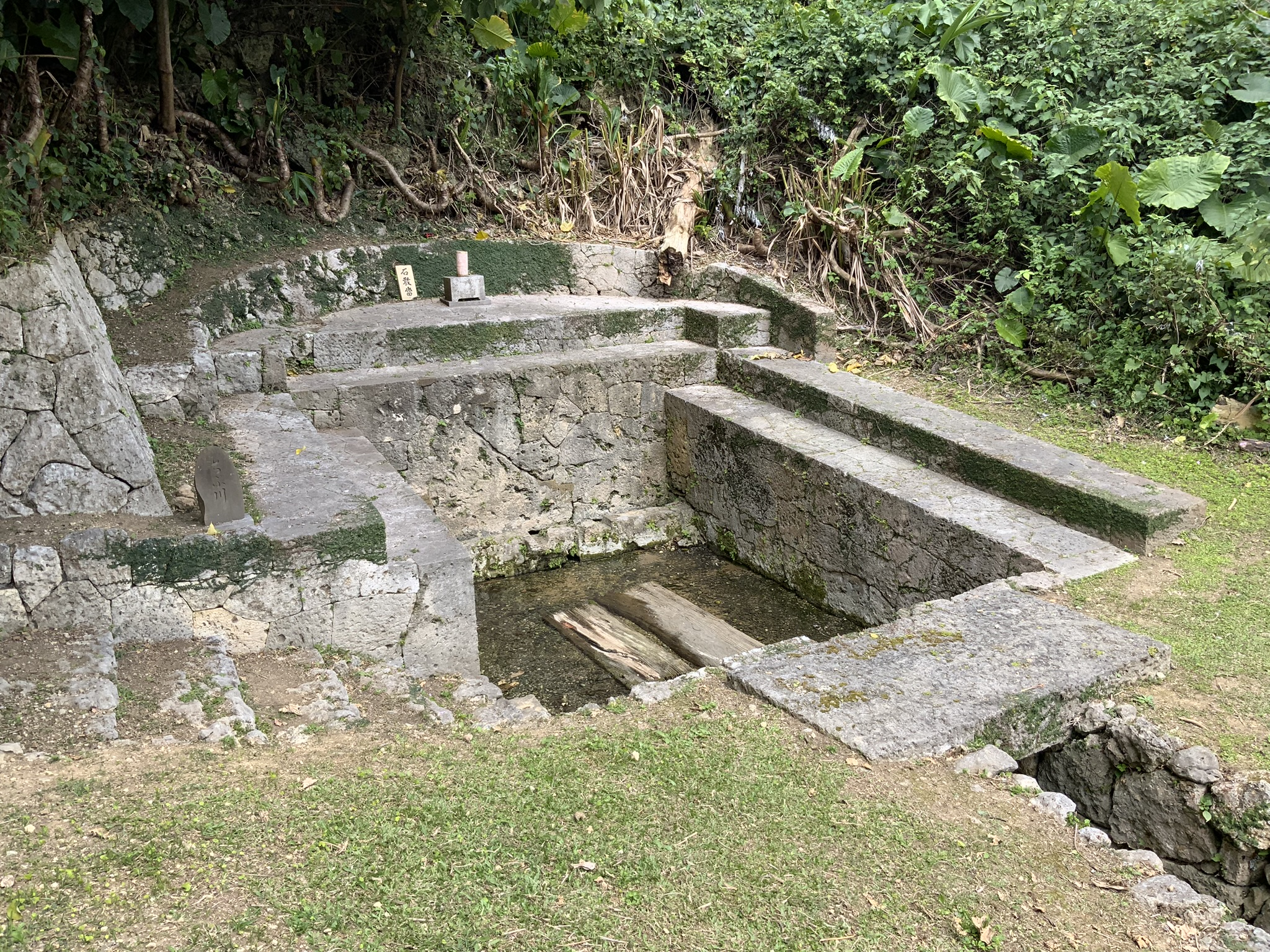
Chibugaa Spring in Chatan, Okinawa

Chibu-gā was located on the eastern side of the settlement of Tamēshi (currently Tamayose). After WWII, the land was seized by the U.S. Forces: it is currently inside Camp Foster.

Chibu-gā was the spring from which the water for childbirth, the first bath of the new borns and the children’s mijinadī ritual was drawn, and is thus also called ubu-gā / nbu-gā (the birth spring). It was also used for the wakamiji sacred water of the new year and the everyday drinking water. Two wooden planks (dīji) were set floating on the water of the basin to ease laundry. They used to be made of Ryūkyū pine, and recycled from the sugar cane press of the settlement.

Chibu-gā constantly had water even during the great droughts. It was used by the people from Tamēshi, but also the neighbouring Chatan and Rindō.

The spring was buried during the construction works for Prefectural Road 130 but it was restored in 2004 and designated as a Municipal Cultural Property that same year. Since the incense burner used to be placed where the prefecture road now runs, it was relocated to the side of the spring.

Two types of masonry can be observed in the stone walls of Chibu-gā: ashlar rectangular masonry (nuno-tsumi) and ashlar polygonal masonry (aikata-tsumi). The water is first collected in a small pool before it is poured into the main pool through three spouts. The spring is accessed by the front left of the main pool, through stairs with nine grades. Although the spring itself is probably older, the stone masonry is dated of the end of 18th or beginning of 19th century.

Chibu-gā is still a sacred place. Prayers called kā-ugami (well prayers) are given there by the members of the Chatan Noro Dunchi household on the 3rd day of the 1st month (lunar calendar) and the 11th day of the 8th month each year. Prayers are also given there on the Ningwachā festival of the 2nd month by the Chatan Noro Dunchi household and the village inhabitants.

The spring was not accessible for several decades and the praying site had been relocated to the Tamayose Settlement Joint Praying Site in Chatan Chōrōyama Ritual Complex (Chatan, Ōmura Tamayosebaru 14). However, during the 2004 renovation, an incense burner was placed anew on the spring side.

=== Folk Cultural Properties ===
==== Agari-nu-utaki ====
Address: 904-0107 Chatan, Aza Ōmura, Gusukubaru 369 (loc. 26.30888°N 127.76590°E)

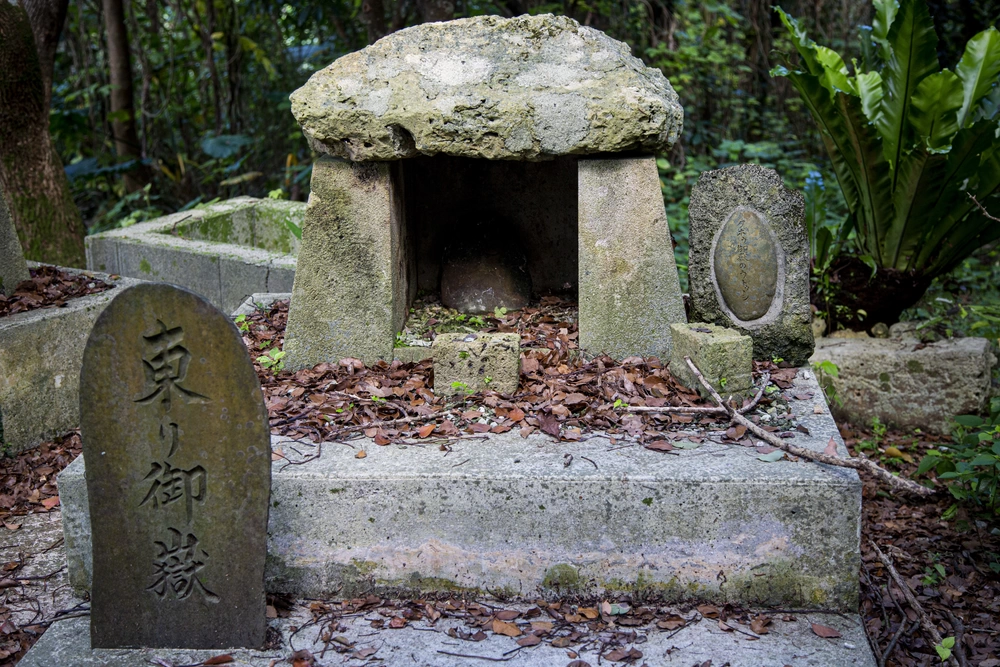
Chatan gusuku Agari-nu-utaki

Agari-nu-utaki or Agari Utaki (lit. “the eastern sacred site”) is designated as a folk cultural property at the municipal level under the name "Agari-nu-utaki Sacred Site (inside Chatan Gusuku)" (Japanese: 北谷城内「東ノ御嶽」).
It is one of the sacred sites located inside Chatan Gusuku. After WWII, the land was seized by the U.S. Forces and a pray-from-afar altar was set for Agari-nu-utaki in Chatan Chōrōyama Ritual Complex. In 1993, while still inside Camp Foster, the sacred site was reconstructed in the southern part of the third enclosure of Chatan Gusuku. It was designated as a "Municipal Folk Cultural Property" by Chatan Town in 2004.
The area of Chatan Gusuku was returned to Japan in 2020 but access is still strictly controlled by the Japanese Defense Bureau.

==== Chatan Tun ====
Address: 904-0107 Chatan, Aza Ōmura, Gusukubaru 369 (loc. 26.30888°N 127.76590°E)

Chatan Tun, locally referred simply as "Tun" (lit. "the residence"), is designated as a folk cultural property at the municipal level under the name "Tun Sacred Site (inside Chatan Gusuku)" (Japanese: 北谷城内「殿」).
It is one of the sacred sites located inside Chatan Gusuku. After WWII, the land was seized by the U.S. Forces and a pray-from-afar altar was set for Chatan Tun in Chatan Chōrōyama Ritual Complex. In 1993, while still inside Camp Foster, the sacred site was reconstructed in the southwestern part of the third enclosure of Chatan Gusuku, about 15 metres northeastward of its original location. It was designated as a Municipal Folk Cultural Property by Chatan Town in 2004.
The area of Chatan Gusuku was returned to Japan in 2020 but access is still strictly controlled by the Japanese Defense Bureau.

=== Historic Sites ===
==== Ireibaru Archaeological Site ====
Address: 904-0102 Chatan, Ihei 1-11 (loc. 26.324229350734°N 127.75839300427°E)

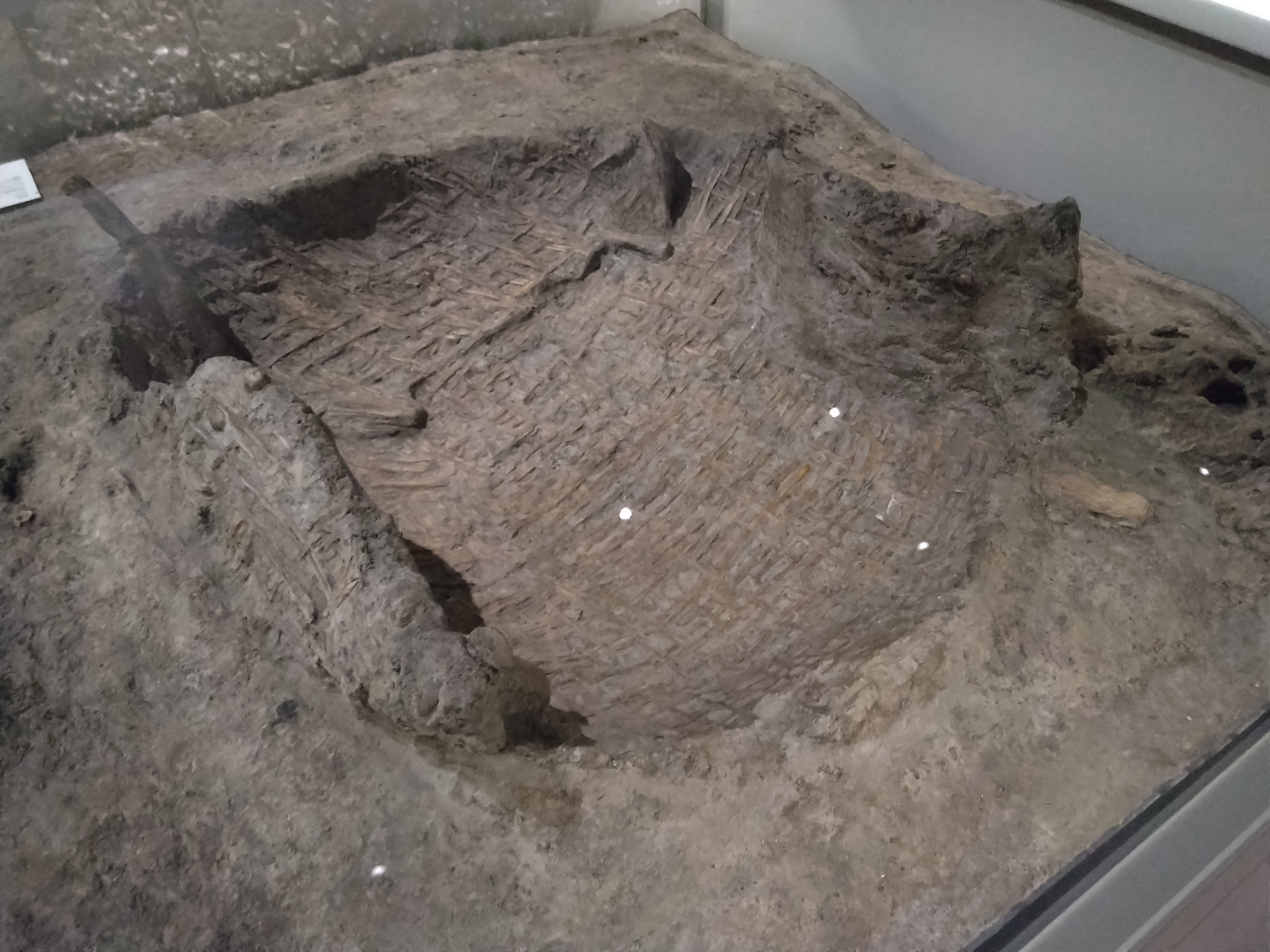
Kaizuka period bamboo basket found in the wet contexts of Ireibaru Site

Ireibaru Archaeological Site (Japanese: 伊礼原遺跡) was designated as a National Historic Site on 22 February 2010.

A three-year survey of a 40.5 ha area located in the northern part of Camp Kuwae, starting in 1995, disclosed ten archaeological sites and six artefact scatters, among which two sites form the Ireibaru Archaeological Site.

Ireibaru has occupations spanning about 7000 years, from the Kaizuka period to the Gusuku period, which makes it particularly important for the Ryūkyūan archaeology. Ireibaru is also the only site in Ryūkyū continually occupied for the whole length of the Kaizuka period.

The site yielded seeds, grains and wooden artefacts that are generally poorly conserved, as well as animal and fish bones or shells, making it possible to reconstruct the evolution of the environment.

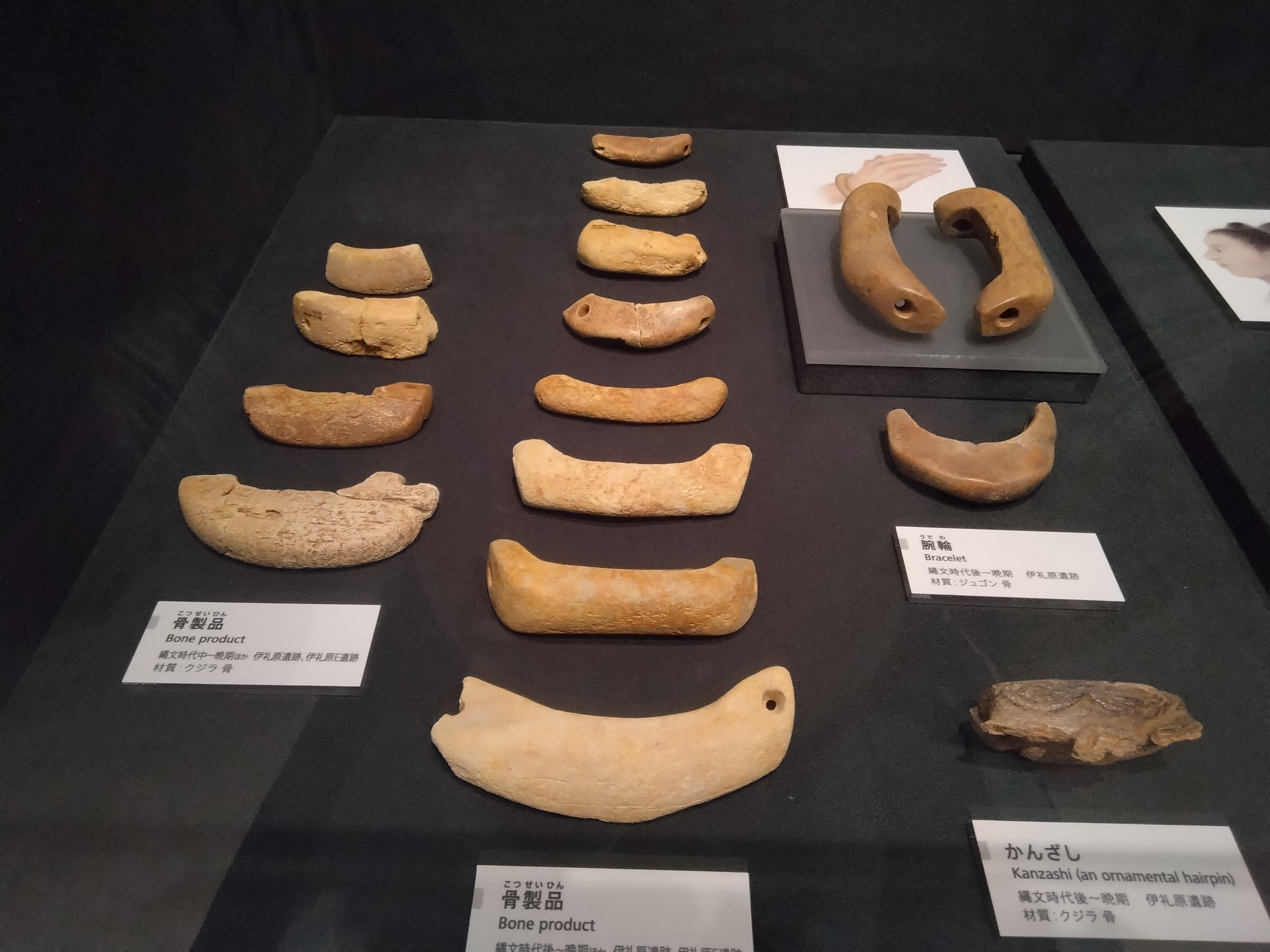
Kaizuka period composite bracelets and hairpins made of animal bones found in Ireibaru Site

Those particulars explain that the site was designated as a National Historic Site in 2010.

The site is located on low lands spreading from the foot of hills to the sea, with a spring at the foot of the hills that provided a large quantity of drinking water. It is also ideally located to exploit both the marine and land resources. Its particular location may explain that it appealed to human populations of so different periods.

The low wetlands drained by the water spring were used as a food collection and then production area, hosting a natural mangrove forest and then rice paddy fields, while the higher grounds at the foot of the hills where sand dunes slowly grew saw the development of settlements. The settlements appear to move in time along the sand dune, but the area is constantly occupied from the Early Kaizuka period to WWII.

==== Chatan Gusuku ====
Address: 904-0107 Chatan, Aza Ōmura, Gusukubaru (loc. 26.30947°N 127.76698°E)

Chatan Castle Site (Japanese: 北谷城跡) was designated as a National Historic Site on 26 March 2021.

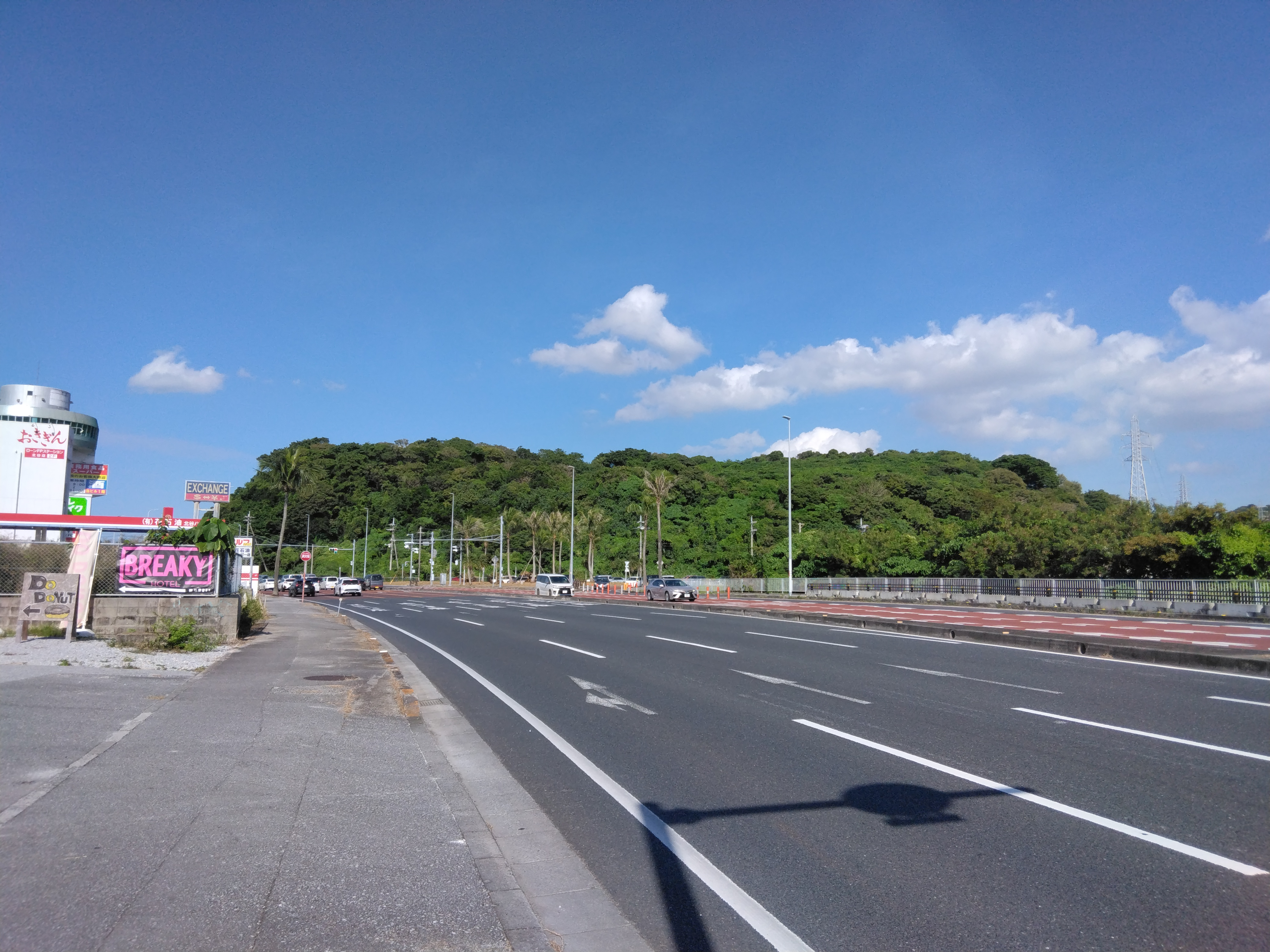
Chatan Gusuku from afar

Chatan Gusuku is a fortress of the Chūzan area that was in use from the latter half of the 13th century to the first half of the 16th century. It is located in the southern part of Chatan Town, on a hill dominating the landscape along the western coast of Okinawa Island, bordered by the Shirahi-gawa River on the north.
The remains are about 500 metres long east-west and between 30 and 100 meters wide north-south, and consist in five enclosures with their associated structures. Its size makes it one of the largest gusukus in Okinawa Island, after Shuri, Nakijin, Itokazu and Nanzan.
The walls present different techniques of masonry such as rubble masonry and ashlar rectangular masonry. The remains of the residential building have been identified, and the site has yielded a large quantity of stoneware and porcelain obtained by oversea trade.

The villages of Chatan, Tamēshi (currently Tamayose) and Rindō that developed on the south side of Chatan Gusuku before WWII were considered as directly linked to the gusuku.

It is an important site for the Ryūkyūan history, starting in the Three Kingdoms period, which is why it was designated as a National Historic Site.

==== Hamagawa Ugan Archaeological Site ====
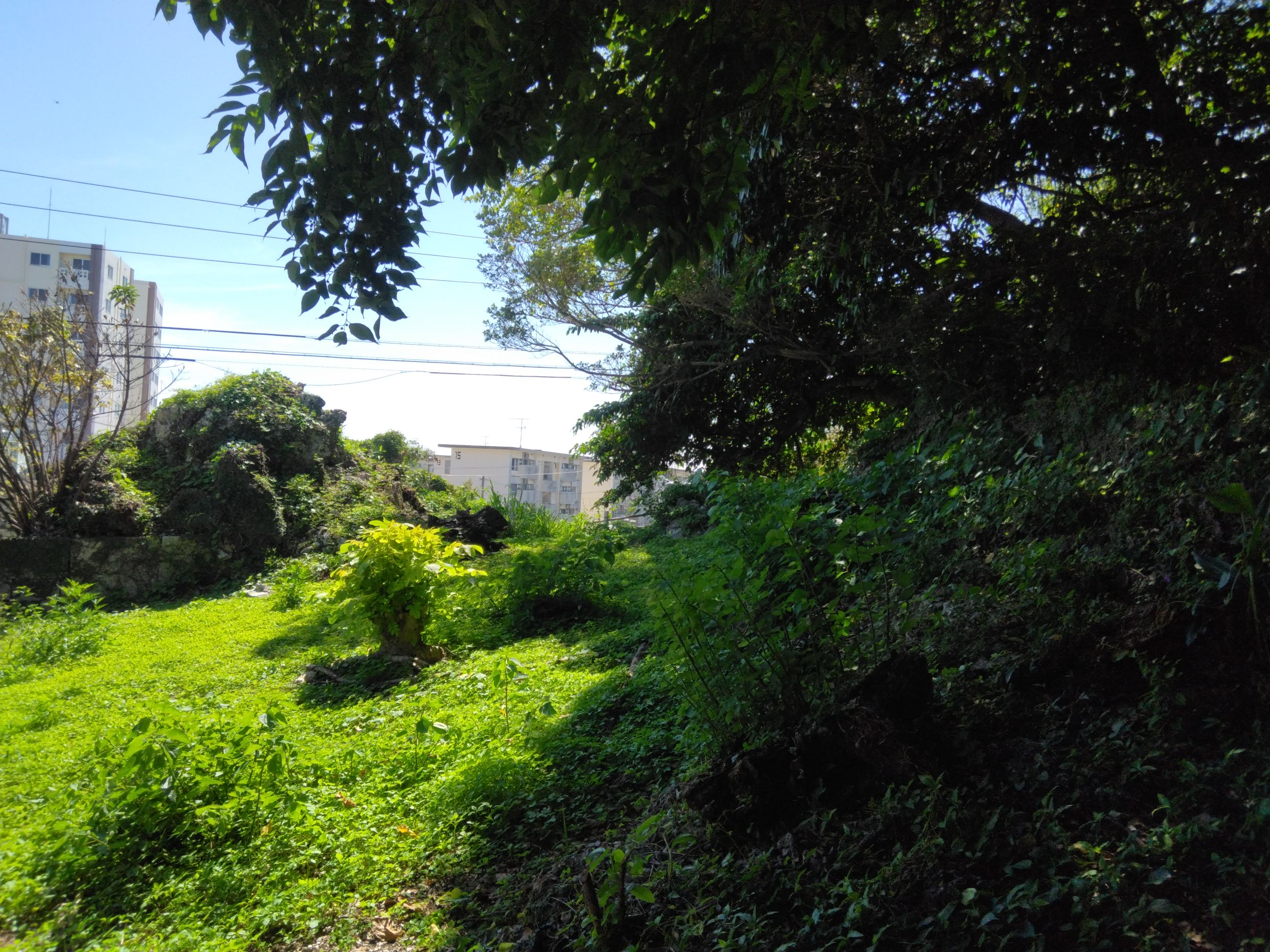
Hamagawa Ugan archaeological site, at the foot of the sacred site

Address: 904-0112 Chatan, Aza Hamagawa, Senbaru 47 (loc. 26.326956019615°N 127.75296714443°E)

Hamagawa Ugan Archaeological Site (Japanese: 浜川ウガン遺跡) is designated as an historic site at the municipal level.

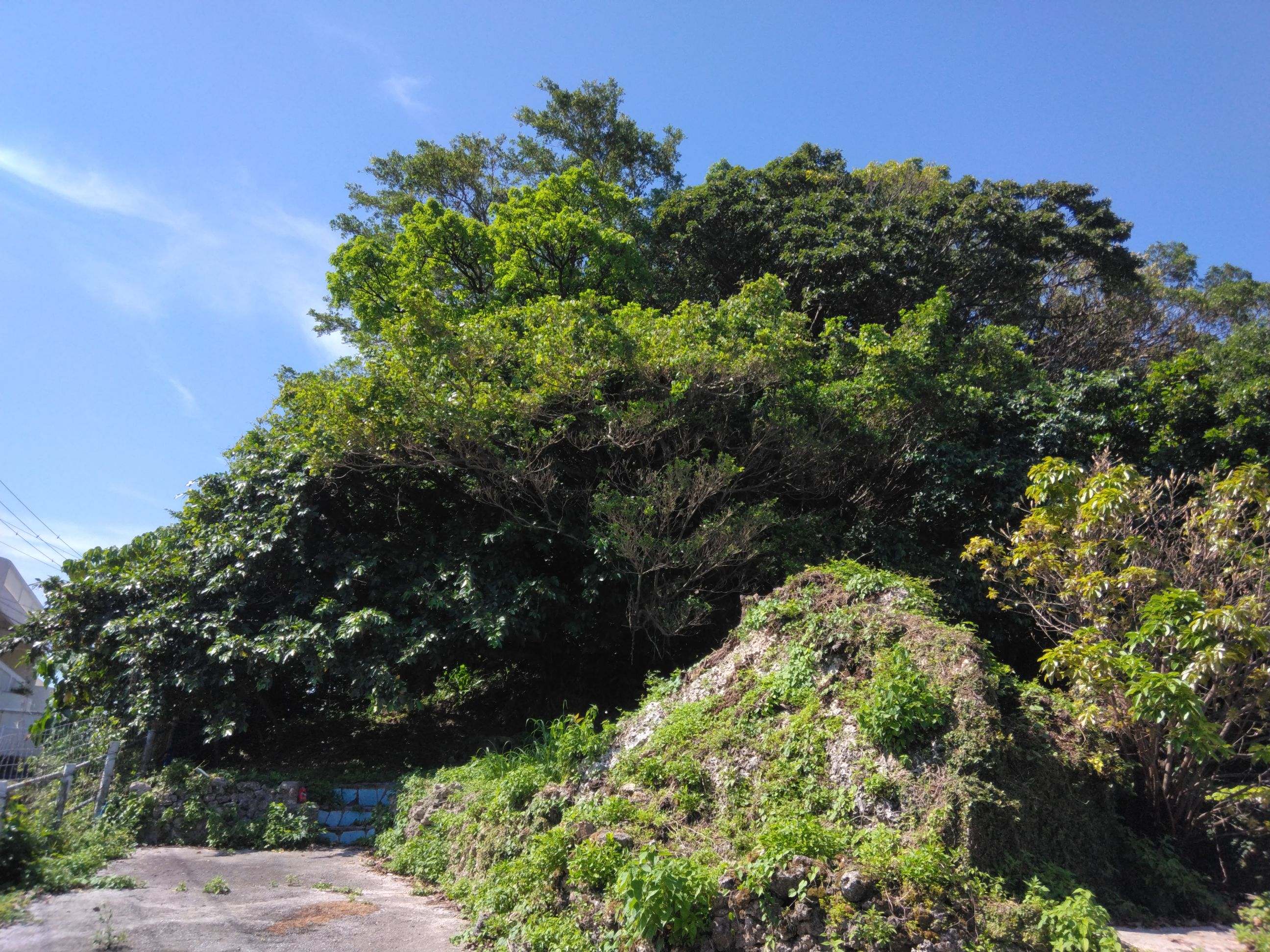
General view of the sacred site of Hamagawa Ugan

Hamagawa Ugan (also "Hamagā Ugan"), one of the sacred sites of Hamagawa Settlement, is a limestone outcrop about 15 metres long, 10 metres wide and 10 metres high, located at the junction between National Road 58 and Prefectural Road 23. It corresponds to the sacred site named "Shimamuiyoriage-no-taki" (島森ヨリアゲノ嶽) in the Ryūkyū-koku yurai-ki.

The archaeological site is located on the southern side of the hill, at the foot of the slope, and consists in a shell mound of marine shells that yielded flat constricted bottom pottery characteristic of the Late Kaizuka period (8th-10th centuries). The site is notable for the discovery of personal ornaments made of cowrie shells, comparable to the ones that have been found in Point No. 7 in Gushikawa Island Site Group (Izena Village). The artefacts are not associated with any archaeological remains of a residential occupation. Although it is possible the artefacts have fallen from the top of the Hamagawa Ugan outcrop, it is very unlikely that there was a settlement on top, since it is difficult to climb and the space on top is very narrow.

Hamagawa Ugan Archaeological Site is considered as important because it could consist in ritual deposits not associated with residential occupation. Such sites are rare in Ryūkyūan archaeology for that period, the only other example being the contemporaneous site of Agigitara Shell Mound in Izena Village.

== Gusukus located in Chatan Town ==
=== Chatan Gusuku ===
(Japanese: 北谷グスク)

=== Ichi Gusuku ===
(Japanese: 池グスク) Address: 904-0105 Chatan, Aza Yoshihara, Agariujibaru / Iriujibaru (loc. 26.310556709426°N 127.76362464935°E)

Located just northwest of Chatan Gusuku, on a small hill on the other side of Shirahi-gawa River, Ichi Gusuku is considered an outpost of Chatan Gusuku. As Chatan Gusuku, Ichi Gusuku played a major part in the resistance to the Satsuma Invasion of 1609. It was completely destroyed during the construction of Military Road 1 / Government Highway 1 (currently National Road 58) after WWII.

The hill included several other sacred sites such as a Bijuru Shrine and Ukkā Aji (Ōkawa Aji)’s Tomb, that have been relocated.

== Archaeological sites located in Chatan Town ==
=== Agarimutibaru Archaeological Site ===
(Japanese: 東表原遺跡) Address: 904-0116 Chatan, Aza Chatan, Agarimutibaru 502. Currently in Camp Foster (loc. 26.301701814369°N 127.76866349906°E)
Settlement remains of the Early Kaizuka period Phase IV and V, disclosed during an archaeological testing survey. Remains included hearths, postholes and pottery. The upper levels correspond to the remains of an Early Modern period settlement.

=== Agariujibaru Old Tomb Complex ===
(Japanese: 東宇地原古墓群) Address: 904-0105 Chatan, Aza Yoshihara, Agariujibaru 1124. (loc. 26.313489883904°N 127.76761891246°E)
Group of Early Modern period and Modern period tombs surveyed during works for the construction of a municipal road.

=== Āmanchu-gama Cave ===
(Japanese: アーマンチュガマ) Address: 904-0112 Chatan, Aza Hamagawa 117-5, 117-54 (loc. 26.327950833891°N 127.7496859907°E)
Human remains (at least three skulls), period unknown.

=== Aniyabaru Archaeological Site ===
(Japanese: 安仁屋原遺跡) Address: 904-0117 Chatan, Aza Kitamae, Aniyabaru. Currently in Camp Foster (loc. 26.29406756823°N 127.76132919594°E)
Early Modern and Modern period settlement remains.

=== Aragusuku-shichabaru No.2 Archaeological Site ===
(Japanese: 新城下原第二遺跡) Address: 904-0117 Chatan, Aza Kitamae, Aniyabaru 348. Currently in Camp Foster (loc. 26.294030002738°N 127.76333207305°E)
Site with occupations of the Kaizuka period, the Gusuku period and Early Modern to Modern periods. It includes a shell mound of the Early Kaizuka period Phase I, cone shell caches of the Late Kaizuka period, and paddy fields of the Gusuku, Early Modern and Modern periods.

=== Chatan Banju Guards House Remains ===
(Japanese: 北谷番所址) Address: 904-0116 Chatan, Aza Chatan, Chatanbaru 4, currently in Camp Foster (loc. 26.307594603986°N 127.76440264538°E)
The guards house was created in the 15th century, and probably replaced Chatan Gusuku in its administrative office, since the castle seems unoccupied after this date. It yielded imported porcelain and brown glazed stoneware. It was included in the Kitatama Elementary School before WWII. An arched stone bridge mentioned in the "Stele of the Renovation of the Ichigusuku-bashi and Gusuku-bashi Bridge" was located nearby, but was destroyed just before WWII.

=== Chatan Gusuku Archaeological Sites ===
(Japanese: 北谷城遺跡群) Address: 904-0107 Chatan, Aza Ōmura, Gusukubaru (loc. 26.309075522031°N 127.76645898531°E)

Group of twelve sites of different periods located on the hill of Chatan Gusuku: Kaniman Aji’s Tomb, Yō Shiho Sashiki Chikudun Kōdō’s Tomb, Chatan Maushi’s Tomb, two unnamed tombs on the cliff to Shirahi-gawa River, a Fensa-kasō pottery scatter (Late Kaizuka period), an artefact scatter with Kaizuka period pottery and Early Modern period stoneware in relation with Sū-gā Spring, the former settlement of Rindō (Chatan Gusuku Site No. 7), an artefact scatter below the cliff of the first, second and third enclosures of the gusuku with pottery of the Late Kaizuka and Gusuku periods, as well as a large quantity of celadon, an artefact scatter of the Early Kaizuka period Phase III on the northeastern side of the gusuku, an artefact scatter with Late Kaizuka period pottery and marine shells on the southeastern side of the gusuku and Chatan Gusuku Shell Mound on the eastern side of the gusuku. There are also at least five tunnels dug by the Japanese Forces during WWII.

=== Chōrōyama Artefact Scatter ===
(Japanese: 長老山遺物散布地) Address: 904-0107 Chatan, Aza Ōmura, Tamēshibaru 14, currently in Camp Foster (loc. 26.306000106248°N 127.768302509°E)
Chatan Chōrōyama has been partly destroyed by the heavy landscape modifications due to the construction of the military base. Chōrōyama was used as the cemetery for the priests of the Jushōin Temple and especially contained the tomb of Nan'yō Shōkō, nicknamed Chatan Chōrō, native of Tamēshi, who introduced Rinzai Myōshin-ji Buddhism to Ryūkyū.
The artefact scatter yielded gusuku pottery, marine shells, white porcelain bowls, ash-glazed bowls and fragments of roof tiles.

=== Deer Fossil Discovery Point ===
(Japanese: 鹿化石出土地) Address: 904-0105 Chatan, Aza Yoshihara, Tōbaru (loc. 26.319943131099°N 127.77792773478°E)
Three fragments of deer bone fossils found in the section of a limestone outcrop cut for road construction. The site was probably destroyed by the works since the subsequent survey could not find any more fossils.

=== Hamagawa-senbaru-iwayama Artefact Scatter ===
(Japanese: 浜川千原岩山遺物散布地) Address: 904-0112 Chatan, Aza Hamagawa, Hamagawa-senbaru 145, 157 (loc. 26.329062467836°N 127.75056878086°E)
Group of old tombs in a limestone outcrop around which Kaizuka Period pottery of the Uzahama type was collected.

=== Hamagawa Ugan Archaeological Site ===
(Japanese: 浜川ウガン遺跡)
See above: Hamagawa Ugan Archaeological Site

=== Hanja-nu-wī Settlement Remains ===
(Japanese: 平安山ヌ上集落跡) Address: 904-0112 Chatan, Aza Hamagawa, currently in Kadena Air Base (loc. 26.33141456802°N 127.75489075999°E)
Yādui settlement still in use until WWII. The site includes the remains of several residences and roads, as well as the pre-war Chatan Normal School.

=== Hanzanbaru A Archaeological Site ===
(Japanese: 平安山原Ａ遺跡) (loc. 26.32563807143°N 127.75576797808°E)
Site set at the location of the former Hanzan Settlement, with a concentration of remains from the Early Modern and Modern periods. Notable artefacts include fragments of a Chinese bronze mirror of the Tang dynasty that was probably the possession of a Noro priestess. The site also yielded artefacts from the Gusuku and Kaizuka periods.

=== Hanzanbaru B Archaeological Site ===
(Japanese: 平安山原Ｂ遺跡) (loc. 26.325666041326°N 127.75684600216°E)
Hanzanbaru B was set at the location of the pre-WWII sugar factory. Below those remains, excavation disclosed four buildings of the Gusuku period (12th century) and groups of postholes attributed to the Late Kaizuka period, with the Gusuku period remains on the higher grounds and the Kaizuka period ones on the lower grounds.

=== Hanzanbaru C Archaeological Site ===
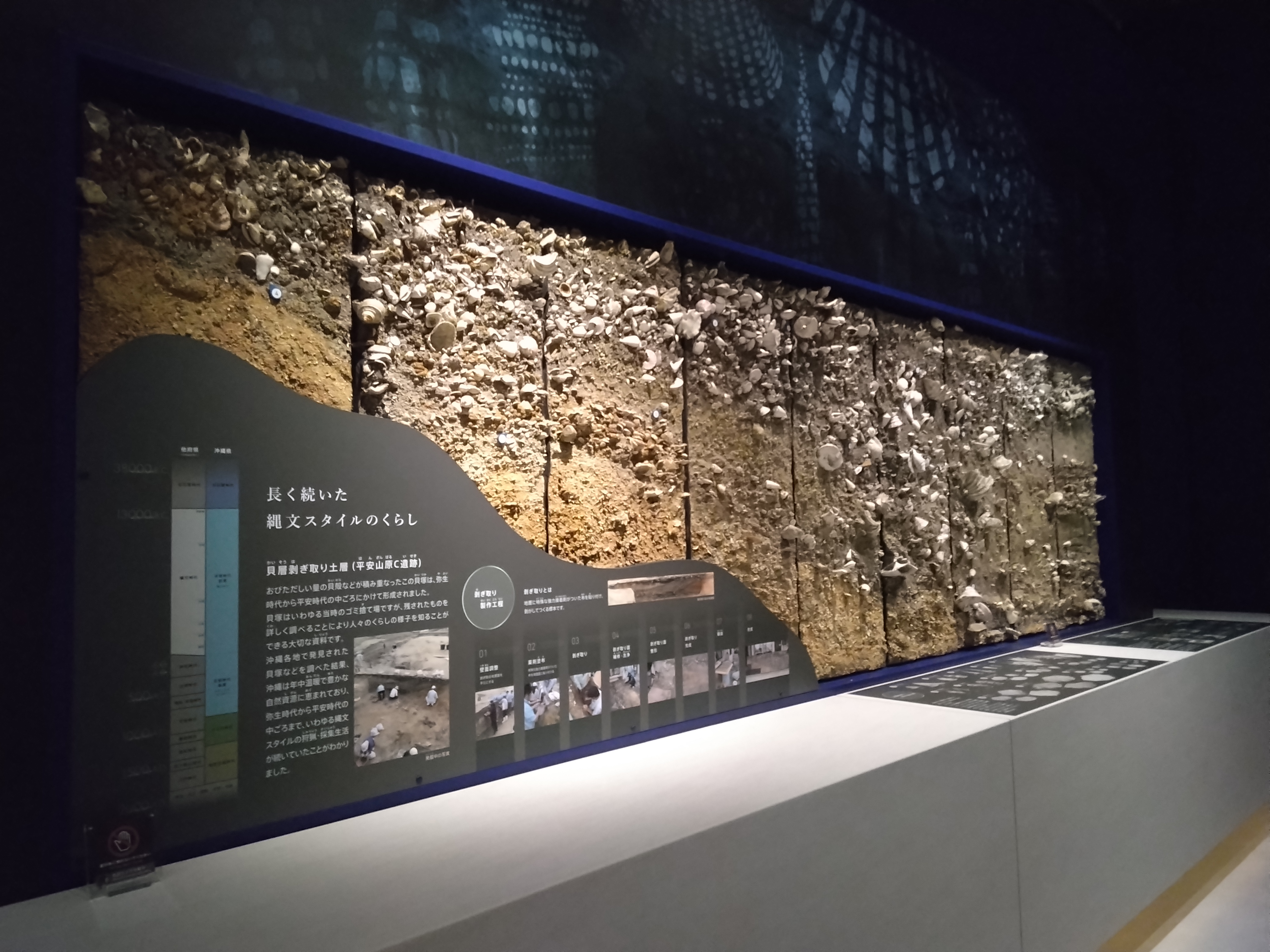
Archaeological layers of Hanzanbaru C

(Japanese: 平安山原Ｃ遺跡) (loc. 26.324892710988°N 127.75701592776°E)
Remains of the pre-WWII settlement (Early Modern to Modern Period), including stone walls and irrigation ditches. Below the Modern, Early Modern and Gusuku period contexts, a shell mound of the Late Kaizuka period was disclosed, that yielded large quantities of pottery.

=== Ichi Gusuku ===
(Japanese: 池グスク) (loc. 26.310544719925°N 127.76359958314°E)

=== Ijisakubaru Old Tomb ===
(Japanese: 伊地差久原古墓) Address: 904-0103 Chatan, Aza Kuwae, Ijisakubaru 841. Currently in Camp Kuwae (loc. 26.315824672312°N 127.76521572089°E)
Archaeological test pits were opened on the southern slope of the hill and revealed stone walls and an ancient floor associated with the tomb. Sherds of brown glazed stoneware, imported from Southern China, dated the construction of the tomb of before the 18th century.

=== Indian Oak Shipwreck Location ===
(Japanese: インディアン・オーク号の座礁地) (loc. 26.30863192204°N 127.74984116851°E)
Submarine archaeological site at the location of the shipwreck of the Indian Oak, ship of the East India Company that wrecked on 14 August 1840. The site includes large quantities of porcelain, stoneware, wine bottles and metallic parts from the ship.

=== Ireibaru Archaeological Site ===
(Japanese: 伊礼原遺跡) (loc. 26.324229350734°N 127.75839300427°E)

=== Ireibaru B Archaeological Site ===
(Japanese: 伊礼原Ｂ遺跡) (loc. 26.323044952647°N 127.75741156321°E)
Site that showed several consecutive layers of occupation from the Kaizuka, Gusuku and Early Modern periods, showing a complete sequence of pottery from Phase II to Phase IV of the Early Kaizuka period. Main discoveries include pottery, animal bones, human bones, lithics and celadon.

=== Ireibaru D Archaeological Site ===
(Japanese: 伊礼原Ｄ遺跡) (loc. 26.324206567645°N 127.75754710773°E)
Remains of a settlement of the Gusuku period.

=== Ireibaru E Archaeological Site ===
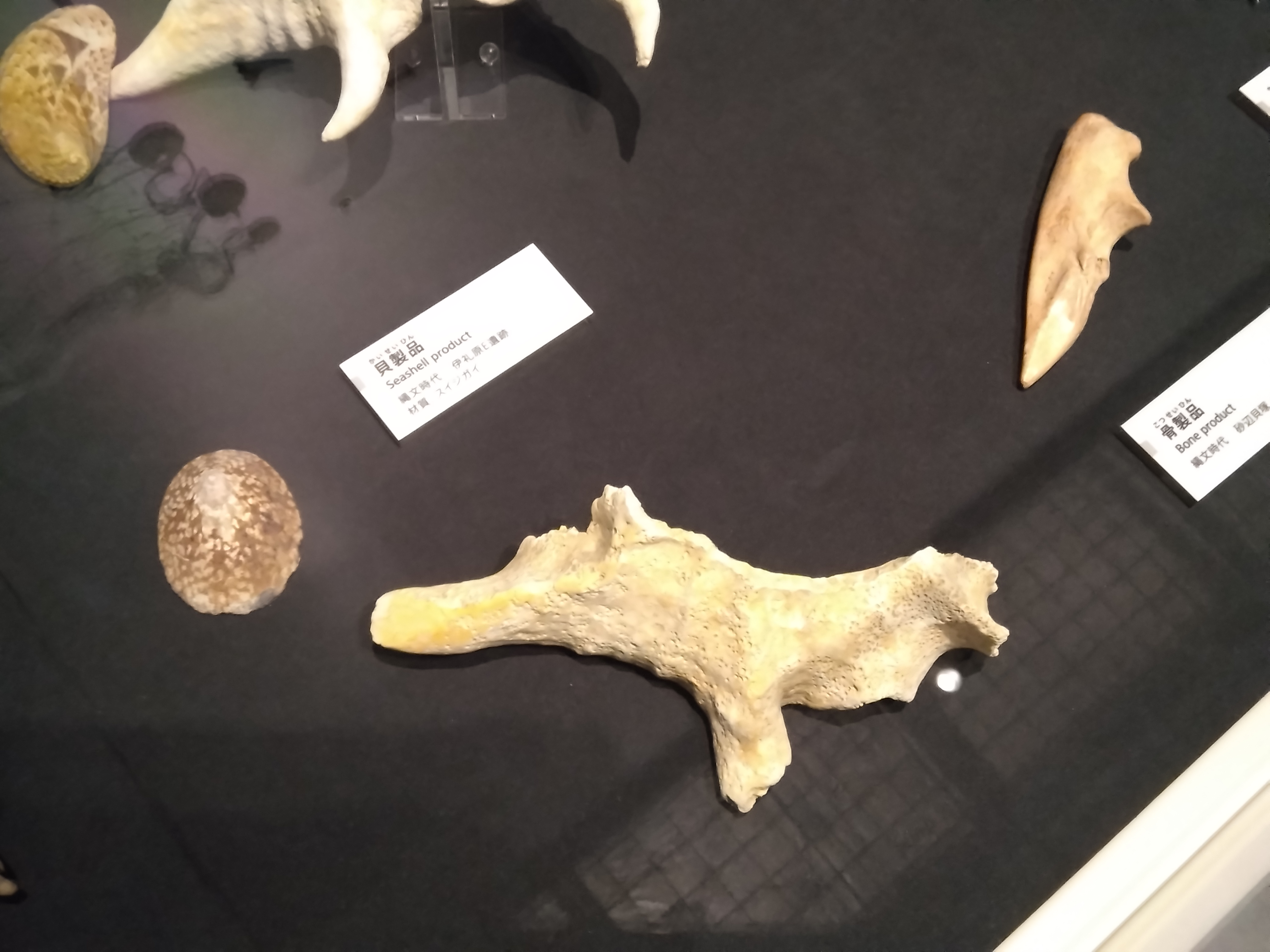
Shell tool from Ireibaru E

(Japanese: 伊礼原Ｅ遺跡) (loc. 26.322519392099°N 127.75944705125°E)
Remains of settlements of the Kaizuka, Gusuku and Early Modern Period.

=== Irei-īmuibaru Archaeological Site ===
(Japanese: 伊礼伊森原遺跡) Currently in Kadena Air Base (loc. 26.3294692112°N 127.76648844841°E)
Remains of terraced fields with stone retaining walls dating back to the 12th to 16th centuries. The site also included remains of several hearths and pit traps, earth pits and postholes. The main discoveries include pottery, stoneware, lithics, iron and other metal implements, as well as seeds, conserved in wet context.

=== Jōmīchā Old Tombs (Three-gate-tombs) ===
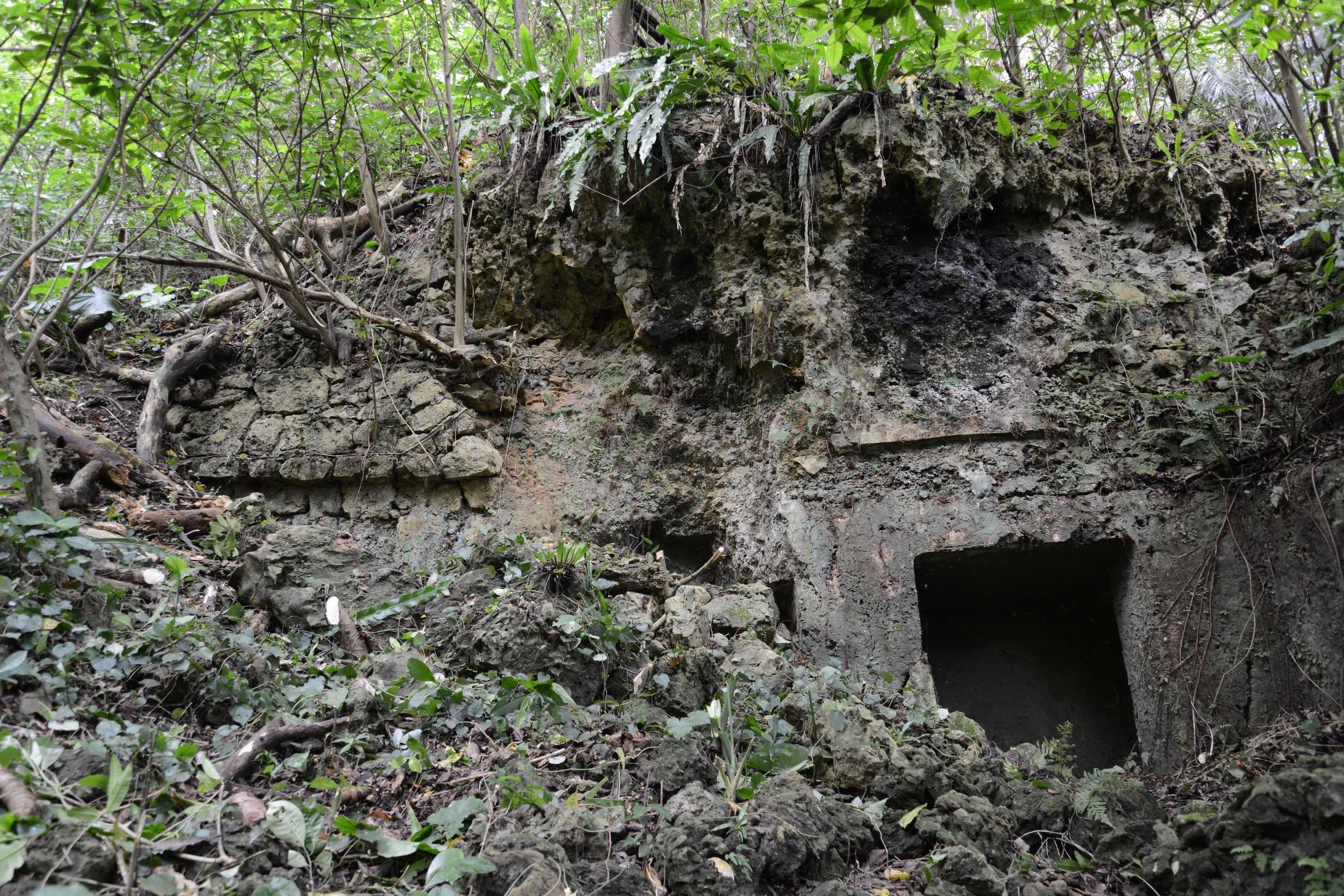
Jōmīchā Old Tomb

(Japanese: ジョーミーチャー古墓) Currently in Camp Kuwae (loc. 26.321850301562°N 127.76333755898°E)
Old tombs dug in the cliff, with three entrances.

=== Kadena Air-Raid Surveillance Post Remains ===
(Japanese: 嘉手納防空監視哨跡) Address: 904-0112 Chatan, Aza Hamagawa 271. Currently in Kadena Air Base (loc. 26.329353484933°N 127.75286679541°E)
WWII-related archaeological site including the foundations of the surveillance post and part of the fence.

=== Kāshīnobonton Artefact Scatter ===
(Japanese: カーシーノボントン遺物散布地) Address: 904-0111 Chatan, Aza Sunabe, Kashibaru 340. Currently in Kadena Air Base (loc. 26.336616099325°N 127.75268590616°E)
The area is a cliff with old tombs. The artefact scatter yielded Uzahama pottery of the Kaizuka period.

=== Kumayā Cave Site ===
(Japanese: クマヤ―洞穴遺跡) Address: 904-0111 Chatan, Aza Sunabe, Son'naibaru 49 (loc. 26.332245897313°N 127.74763473494°E)
Natural cave in Sunabe. The cave is about 40 metres long and served as air-raid shelter for about 300 persons during WWII. It also yielded remains of the Early Kaizuka period Phase II (pottery and human remains), Phase IV (pottery), Phase V (pottery and human remains), of the Gusuku period (celadon and white porcelain, short sword, glass beads and iron arrowheads) and of the Early Modern period (used as a tomb).
The main occupation was that of the Kaizuka period Phase V, when it served as a tomb for several hundreds of individuals in a collective burial. Artefacts included a large quantity of pottery, shell bracelets, pendants and fragments of jade beads.
The artefacts of the Gusuku period include several bowls and incense burner of celadon and white porcelain of very good quality suggesting the cave had become a sacred site.

=== Kumuibaru Archaeological Site ===
(Japanese: 小堀原遺跡) Address: 904-0103 Chatan, Aza Kuwae 226 (loc. 26.320880119425°N 127.76232770905°E)
The site includes two stages of occupation, with a settlement of the 10th to 12th centuries (Gusuku period) that included residences and raised floor granaries, and contexts of the Late Kaizuka period (postholes, pottery, lithics, shells, animal bones).

=== Kushibaru Archaeological Site ===
(Japanese: 後原遺跡) Address: 904-0107 Chatan, Aza Ōmura, Kushibaru. Currently in Camp Foster (loc. 26.306991872191°N 127.77155424255°E)
Archaeological testings revealed the presence of deposits from the Gusuku, Early Modern and Modern periods. The main discoveries include celadon, Thai stoneware and Okinawan stoneware.

=== Kushikanikubaru Archaeological Site ===
(Japanese: 後兼久原遺跡) Address: 904-0103 Chatan, Aza Kuwae, Kushikanikubaru. Currently partly in Camp Kuwae (loc. 26.320091985328°N 127.76463821225°E)
Settlement of the Gusuku period, remains include residences, raised floor granaries, fields, hearths, storage pits and burials. The site yielded pottery, white porcelain, celadon, blue-and-white porcelain, glass, knives, nails, coins, and shells and animal bones. The formerly identified "Kuwae Artefact Scatter" was found to be part of this site during the excavations.

=== Kuwae-nu-tun Artefact Scatter ===
(Japanese: 桑江の殿遺物散布地) Address: 904-0103 Chatan, Aza Kuwae, Kumuibaru 278-279-280. Currently in Camp Kuwae (loc. 26.321976515236°N 127.76279820363°E)
Artefact scatter (mainly pottery) of the Gusuku period around Kuwae-nu-tun, on the left bank of the Naru-kā River.

=== Maehara-furujima A Archaeological Site ===
(Japanese: 前原古島Ａ遺跡) Address: 904-0103 Chatan, Aza Kuwae, Kuwaebaru 60-62. Currently in Camp Kuwae (loc. 26.317111581697°N 127.76332791337°E)
Remains of an old settlement dated of the Early Modern period by the presence of Kina ware. Main finds were stoneware and animal bones.

=== Maehara-furujima B Archaeological Site ===
(Japanese: 前原古島Ｂ遺跡) Address: 904-0103 Chatan, Aza Kuwae, Mēbaru 1018. Currently in Camp Kuwae (loc. 26.31510295119°N 127.76280444321°E)
Remains of an old settlement with a layer having yielded celadon below the Early Modern one with Tsuboya and Kina wares.

=== Maehara Old Tomb Complex ===
(Japanese: 前原古墓群) Address: 904-0103 Chatan, Aza Kuwae, Mēbaru 978-2, 1070. Currently in Camp Kuwae (loc. 26.31415276938°N 127.76620534625°E)
Group of eight tombs in the cliffs of a 10-20 metres high hill.

=== Matayoshigwā-gama Cave ===
(Japanese: 又吉グァーガマ) Address: 904-0106 Chatan, Aza Tamagami. Currently in Camp Foster (loc. 26.313210958567°N 127.77900163396°E)
WWII-related site: natural cave that served as air-raid shelter for the civilians.

=== Nnifushibaru Archaeological Site ===
(Japanese: 稲干原遺跡) Address: 904-0117 Chatan, Aza Kitamae, Nnifushibaru 643. Currently in Camp Foster (loc. 26.298967820845°N 127.767764518°E)
Late Kaizuka period site that has yielded Hamayabaru type pottery.

=== Senbaru Archaeological Site ===
(Japanese: 千原遺跡) Address: 904-0112 Chatan, Aza Hamagawa, Senbaru (loc. 26.326931323655°N 127.75425613708°E)
The site comprised ditches, postholes and earth pits of the Early Modern to Modern period. This recent land use apparently destroyed an older Gusuku period occupation for which only artefacts remained: kamuiyaki ware, white porcelain and celadon. Scoriae and burnt earth hinted at the presence of a smithy in the vicinity. Notable remains include a pig burial and a cache of 1862 cowrie shells, probably stored before exportation.

=== Shichashīdu Settlement Remains ===
(Japanese: 下勢頭集落跡) Address: 904-0112 Chatan, Aza Hamagawa, Shichashīdubaru. Currently in Kadena Air Base. (loc. 26.332789219784°N 127.758771215°E)
Remains of the stone walls of a pre-WWII residence, fūru (pigpen latrines).

=== Shirahi-gawa River Estuary Artefact Scatter ===
(Japanese: 白比川河口遺物散布地) Address: 904-0116 Chatan, Aza Chatan 1-2. (loc. 26.309331691807°N 127.7626784854°E)
One weathered pottery sherd found in 1979.

=== Shirahi-gawa River Suicide Boat Secret Tunnel Complex ===
(Japanese: 白比川沿いの特攻艇秘匿壕群) Address: 904-0107 Chatan, Aza Ōmura, Gusukubaru 374, 363, 357-1, Yoshihara 988, 1008. (loc. 26.310139504333°N 127.76625425322°E)
Complex of thirty to forty tunnels dug in December 1944 in the cliffs along Shirahi-gawa River to shelter the suicide boats to be used by the Japanese Navy in case of attack against Okinawa Island. Each tunnel was supposed to shelter two boats, but only about twenty of them were ever stationed there. The boats were dispatched to the Kerama Islands in the night of 29 March 1945, none returned.

=== Sūgābaru Archaeological Site ===
(Japanese: 塩川原遺跡) Address: 904-0116 Chatan, Aza Chatan, Sūgābaru 444. Currently in Camp Foster. (loc. 26.307351824851°N 127.76689046488°E)
Gusuku period site found by an archaeological testing survey during which pottery, celadon and sea shells were retrieved.

=== Sunabe Sākubaru Shell Mound ===
(Japanese: 砂辺サーク原貝塚) Address: 904-0111 Chatan, Aza Sunabe, Sākubaru 770. Currently in Kadena Air Base. (loc. 26.338239656222°N 127.747991993°E)
The site was discovered in 1980 by construction workers who were installing underground electric cables. An archaeologist was sent on site and was able to observe the archaeological layers in the electric cable trenches. Several Late Kaizuka period pottery sherds and two stone axes were collected.

=== Sunabe Sākubaru Archaeological Site ===
(Japanese: 砂辺サーク原遺跡) Address: 904-0111 Chatan, Aza Sunabe, Kashibaru 415, 444. Currently partly in Kadena Air Base. (loc. 26.336972735016°N 127.7497255526°E)
The site has revealed occupational layers of the Kaizuka, Gusuku, Early Modern and Modern periods. The Gusuku occupation corresponds to a village of the 12th to 14th centuries, with a large quantity of postholes that belong to at least eight buildings, including raised floor granaries. Most of the artefacts collected come from the Gusuku period layer: pottery, stone tools, imported stoneware, white porcelain, tuyeres, iron scoriae, talc implements and raw obsidian. The Early Modern period occupation also corresponds to a settlement, of the 18th century.

=== Sunabe Shell Mound ===
(Japanese: 砂辺貝塚) Address: 904-0111 Chatan, Aza Sunabe, Son’naibaru 147, 502-505. (loc. 26.334462459917°N 127.74944365363°E)
The site was discovered after WWII when the U.S. Forces used the area as a stone quarry. It was thought mainly destroyed until 1986 when archaeological testing surveys revealed its scope was larger than expected. The main remains correspond to a settlement of the Early Kaizuka period Phase IV to V, including the remains of a squared dwelling paved with sandstone cobbles, but pottery from all phases of the Kaizuka period have been collected. The upper layers have yielded Early Modern period Kina ware and cow bones probably linked to a former road.

=== Sunabe Ugan Archaeological Site ===
(Japanese: 砂辺ウガン遺跡) Address: 904-0111 Chatan, Aza Sunabe, Katakashibaru 524. (loc. 26.333276823943°N 127.74975633133°E)
This site is located in a sacred area that includes a tun, a sacred well and a noro's tomb. It used to be connected to the Sunabe Shell Mound hill before post-WWII landscape alterations. Gusuku period pottery have been collected there in 1979, but no further survey has been done.

=== Takabushibaru Paddy Fields Remains ===
(Japanese: 高畔原水田跡) Address: 904-0116 Chatan, Aza Chatan, Takabushibaru. Currently in Camp Foster. (loc. 26.300555661694°N 127.76787094156°E)
Remains of paddy fields dated of the Early Modern and Modern periods, disclosed during a series of archaeological testing surveys.

=== Tamayosebaru Archaeological Site ===
(Japanese: 玉代勢原遺跡) Address: 904-0107 Chatan, Aza Ōmura, Tamēshibaru 43-44. Currently in Camp Foster. (loc. 26.306817675017°N 127.76925092316°E)
This site corresponds to the centre of the former Tamayose (Tamēshi) Settlement that was destroyed by the construction of the military base. Excavations in 1991 revealed a complex stratigraphy of five archaeological layers. The upper levels correspond to the pre-WWII village, with remains of residences and stone walls. The lower levels correspond to Gusuku and Kaizuka Periods occupations. The Gusuku levels yielded Gusuku pottery, Kamuiyaki ware, stoneware (brown-glazed stoneware imported from Thailand, dated of the end of the 14th century), porcelain (white porcelain of the mid-14th century and blue-and-white porcelain of the mid-15th century), old coins and shell implements. The Kaizuka levels yielded Late Kaizuka period pottery of the beginning of the 8th century and a variety of stone tools.

=== Ukinju-gama Cave ===
(Japanese: ウキンジュガマ（受水洞穴）) Address: 904-0103 Chatan, Aza Kuwae. (loc. 26.326547916874°N 127.7737314404°E)
WWII-related site, the cave served as shelter for the civilians of the area. More than one hundred persons hid inside. One of the inhabitants, who had come back from Hawaii, was able to explain to the US soldiers outside that the cave was only occupied by civilians and they were not killed.

=== Ufudōbaru A Archaeological Site ===
(Japanese: 大道原Ａ遺跡) Address: 904-0116 Chatan, Aza Chatan, Ufudōbaru 983, 992. Currently in Camp Foster. (loc. 26.300271661696°N 127.7707806111°E)
Gusuku period site found by an archaeological testing survey. Gusuku pottery was collected. It is thought the main part of the site is currently under buildings.

=== Ufudōbaru B Archaeological Site ===
(Japanese: 大道原Ｂ遺跡) Address: 904-0116 Chatan, Aza Chatan, Ufudōbaru 993. Currently in Camp Foster. (loc. 26.299945760349°N 127.77142873983°E)
Site located one step higher on the same hill as Ufudōbaru A, and discovered during an archaeological testing survey as well. The site is very disturbed, partly destroyed. It yielded very small Kaizuka pottery sherds and wood fragments.

=== Ufudōbaru C Archaeological Site ===
(Japanese: 大道原Ｃ遺跡) Address: 904-0116 Chatan, Aza Chatan, Ufudōbaru 1080. Currently in Camp Foster. (loc. 26.298209314831°N 127.77341177633°E)
Site disclosed by a testing survey, presence of Gusuku pottery and remains from an Early Modern period settlement.

=== Ufudōbaru D Archaeological Site ===
(Japanese: 大道原Ｄ遺跡) Address: 904-0116 Chatan, Aza Chatan, Ufudōbaru 920. Currently in Camp Foster. (loc. 26.30072374313°N 127.76850984529°E)
Site disclosed by a testing survey, presence of pottery from the Early Kaizuka period Stages IV and V. Most of the site is currently located below buildings.

=== Ufusakubaru Old Tomb Complex ===
(Japanese: 大作原古墓群) Address: 904-0102 Chatan, Aza Ihei, Ufusakubaru 538. Currently in Kadena Air Base. (loc. 26.327962005352°N 127.75808591849°E)
Group of seventeen old tombs of the Early Modern and Modern periods, built by the people of Hanzan, Hamagawa and Irei.

=== Ukamajī Naval Battery Remains ===
(Japanese: ウカマジー海軍砲台跡) Address: 904-0112 Chatan, Aza Hamagawa 252. Currently in Kadena Air Base. (loc. 26.335537855324°N 127.75837647263°E)
Battery foundations and tunnels built for the Japanese Navy by January 1945. It is currently inside the golf course of Kadena Air Base, the tunnels are partly collapsed. The explanation panel set by the US Forces states that it is the location of a campaign hospital, but the site only included nine cannons, underground storage for the ammunitions and an observation post.

=== Uwīsedō /Shichasedō Area Old Tomb Complex ===
(Japanese: 上・下勢頭区古墓群) Address: 904-0101 Chatan, Aza Uwīsedō, Hanzan, Imuibaru / Aza Irei, Imuibaru, Aza Shichasedō, Hanzan, Shichasedōbaru. Currently in Kadena Air Base. (loc. 26.330889141953°N 127.76620583978°E)
Group of one hundred and eighty-six tombs (one hundred and thirty-six main tombs and fifty temporary tombs) mostly built by the residents of Uwīsedō and Shichasedō, two areas that were peopled by noble families from Naha starting in the 18th century. The artefacts and the funerary urns retrieved from the tombs suggest that the oldest ones date back to the mid-17th century and that most of them were built by the beginning of the 19th century. The site also includes a land survey stone (shirubiishi) of the Kingdom period, a well (Agari-gā) and two residences.

=== Yamagābaru Old Tomb Complex ===
(Japanese: 山川原古墓群) Address: 904-0107 Chatan, Aza Ōmura, Yamagābaru 448, 450, 454. (loc. 26.309361455139°N 127.77160221723°E)
Group of old tombs along Shirahi-gawa River, by Chatan Gusuku, six of which were surveyed. All of the surveyed tombs were dug into the cliff and closed with stone walls. Most of the human remains had been taken by the families when the land was seized by the U.S. forces. The funerary urns were left in front of the tombs. Thirty-five of the funerary urns had funerary inscriptions that dated the oldest ones between 1715 and 1725.

=== Yokodakibaru Archaeological Site ===
(Japanese: 横嵩原遺跡) Address: 904-0117 Chatan, Aza Kitamae, Yokodakibaru 928. Most of the site is located in Kitanakagusuku Village. Currently in Camp Foster. (loc. 26.300697970806°N 127.77446727348°E)
The site is dated of the Gusuku period. Archaeological testings have disclosed postholes, pottery, celadon and stone tools.

=== Yoshihara-agarichimumatabaru Artefact Scatter ===
(Japanese: 吉原東角双原遺物散布地) Address: 904-0105 Chatan, Aza Yoshihara, Agarichimumatabaru 931-1. (loc. 26.310857738296°N 127.77194585142°E)
Discovery of one stone axe.
