= Tyne (1807 ship) =

19th century British merchant ship

History

United Kingdom
- Name: Tyne
- Owner: 1807:John Locke; 1818:Parker
- Port of registry: London
- Builder: Samuel & Daniel Brent, Rotherhithe
- Launched: 1807
- Fate: Burned and sank in March 1828

General characteristics
- Tons burthen: 462, or 48431/94 or 486, or 489 (bm)
- Length: 112 ft 4 in (34.2 m) (overall); 88 ft 7 3/8 in (27.0 m) (keel)
- Beam: 31 ft 4 in (9.6 m)
- Depth of hold: 16 ft 0 in (4.9 m)
- Armament: 10 × 18-pounder carronades
- Notes: Two decks

Tyne was launched in 1807 in Rotherhithe. She spent the first part of her career as a West Indiaman. However, in 1810–1811 she made a voyage to India for the British East India Company (EIC) as an "extra" ship, i.e., under charter. Thereafter, with a change of owners, she traded with the Far East under a license issued by the EIC. Then in 1818 she made a voyage to Port Jackson, New South Wales transporting convicts. A fire destroyed her in 1828 in Bombay Harbour.

== Career ==
One source reports that Tyne initially sailed as a West Indiaman. However, then it is not clear why she did appear as such either in Lloyd's Register (LR) or Lloyd's List. There are hints that she may have been a government transport.

Although Tyne had been launched in 1807, she did not appear in LR until 1810, and then only on a page of vessels serving the EIC.

=== EIC voyage (1810–1811) ===
On 16 March 1810 the EIC accepted John Locke's tender of Tyne for one voyage at a rate of £38 10s 0d per ton, for 480 tons.

Captain Robert Brooks sailed Tyne from Portsmouth on 9 June 1810 bound for Bengal and Madras. She reached Madeira on 26 June and arrived at Saugor on 8 December. Homeward bound, she left Bengal on 8 February 1811 and on 27 February arrived at Madras. From there she reached St Helena on 16 June and arrived at the Downs on 30 August.

In 1813 the EIC had lost its monopoly on the trade between India and Britain. British ships were then free to sail to India or the Indian Ocean under a licence from the EIC. Tyne's owners applied for a licence to sail east of the Cape of Good Hope. They applied on 12 June 1816, and received the licence on 17 June.

=== Convict voyage (1818–1819) ===
In 1818 Tyne's master was C. Bell, her owner J. Locke, changing to Parker, and her trade London—Batavia, changing to London—Botany Bay. Captain Casey Bell sailed Tyne from Ireland. She arrived at Port Jackson on 4 January 1819. She had embarked 180 male convicts, of whom one died en route. One officer and 29 rank-and-file of the 84th Regiment of Foot provided the guard.

Thereafter she traded to the Far East under a license from the EIC. In 1823 Tyne was almost rebuilt.

Year	Master	Owner	Trade	Source & notes
1823	Brodie; J.Craigie	Parker & Co.	London–India	LR; rebuilt 1823
1827	J.Craigie; Colgrave	Parker; Webb & Co.	London–India	LR; rebuilt 1823

== Fate ==
Tyne left Portsmouth for Bombay on 28 August 1827, possibly with cargo transferred from Lady Nugent. In June Lady Nugent, Cotgrave, master, had had to put into Portsmouth because she was leaky and required repairs.

On 19 March 1828 Tyne was under the command of Captain Cotgrave when she caught fire in Bombay Harbour and was destroyed. She caught fire at about 20:30 and burned for some eight hours before she sank. There were no deaths.
