= Ajax (1811 ship) =

British merchant ship (1811–1822)

History

United Kingdom
- Name: Ajax
- Builder: Wright & Harle, South Shields, Newcastle-on-Tyne
- Launched: 1811
- Fate: Condemned c. March 1822

General characteristics
- Tons burthen: 472 (bm)
- Armament: 1812: 2 guns; 1815: 8 or 10 × 18-pounder carronades

Ajax was launched in 1811 at South Shields. She was initially a London-based transport, but from 1816 became an East Indiaman, sailing between Britain and India. She was condemned at Calcutta in 1822.

== Career ==
Ajax first appeared in Lloyd's Register (LR) in 1812 with Wright, owner.

Lloyd's Register and the Register of Shipping (RS) were only as accurate as shipowners chose to keep them. Also, the registers did not publish at exactly the same time, even when publishing for the same year. Consequently, there are frequently discrepancies between them.

Year	Master	Owner	Trade	Source and notes
1815	C. Thompson	Horle & Co. (or Horley & Co.)	London transport	LR
1815	Barnes	Wright	London transport	RS

In 1813 the British East India Company (EIC) lost its monopoly on the trade between Britain and India. A number of shipowners then entered the trade.

In 1816 Joseph Somes purchased Ajax and started sailing to India under a license from the EIC. On 3 November 1816 J. Somes sailed Ajax for Bombay. She sailed from Gravesend on 9 December 1816.

Year	Master	Owner	Trade	Source and notes
1816	C. Thompson; Somes	Horle & Co. Somes	London transport London–India	LR
1820	W. Clark	Somes & Co.	London–India	LR
1823	W.Clark	Somes & Co.	London–Fort William, India	LR

== Fate ==
Ajax, Clarke, master, arrived at Bengal on 2 November 1821 from London and Madras. On 26 January 1822 Ajax, Scott, master, sailed for the Cape and Gibraltar.

On 23 August 1822 Lloyd's List reported that Ajax, Scott, master, bound for the Cape and Gibraltar had had to put back to Calcutta, leaky. She put back on 3 March and would have to be docked. Ajax, Scott, master, originally bound from Calcutta to Malta, was condemned. Her cargo was transhipped on Lady Nugent. At the time, Lady Nugent was expected to sail from Calcutta in May. She did, but had to put back to Calcutta after having sustained damage in a storm and having had to jettison a third of her cargo; water in the hold ruined another third of the cargo.
