= Lady Nugent (1814 ship) =

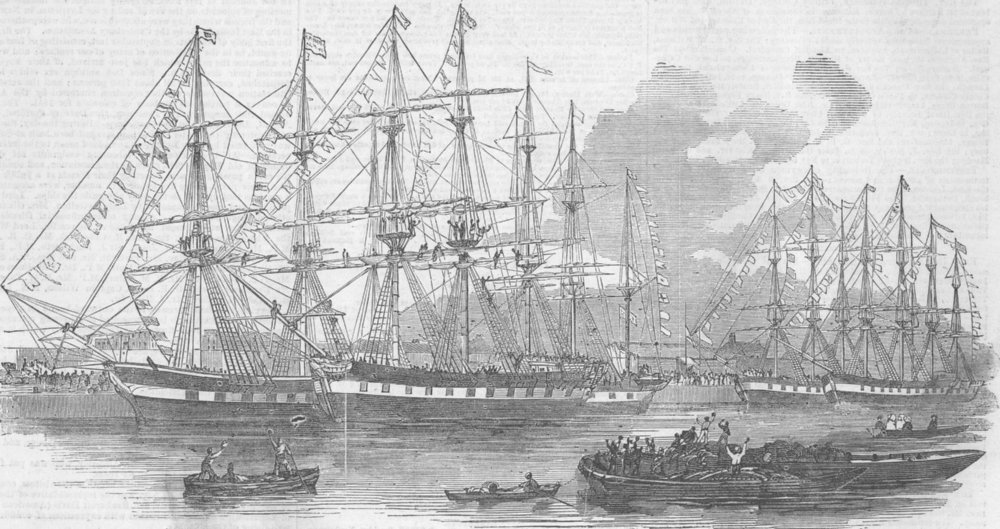
- The Canterbury association ships, Bangalore, Dominion, Duke of Portland, Lady Nugent, and Canterbury

History

United Kingdom
- Name: Lady Nugent
- Builder: J. Scott & Co., Fort Gloster, Calcutta; 1827:Wigram & Co.; 1834:Campbell & Co.; Sir George Hodgkinson.; J. Somes; Haviside
- Launched: 2 September 1814
- Fate: Foundered May 1854

General characteristics
- Tons burthen: Originally: 492, or 514, or 51450/94, or 515 (bm); Post-1843:642 or 668 (bm)
- Length: 117 ft 8 in (35.9 m)
- Beam: 32 ft 0 in (9.8 m)
- Propulsion: Sail

Lady Nugent was built at Bombay in 1813. She made four voyages under contract to the British East India Company (EIC). She then made two voyages transporting convicts to Australia, one to New South Wales and one to Van Diemen's Land (Tasmania). She also made several voyages with emigrants to New Zealand under charter to the New Zealand Company or the Canterbury Association. She foundered in May 1854, with the loss of some 400 persons, most of them soldiers that she was carrying from Madras to Rangoon.

== Career ==
Between 1814 and 1825, Lady Nugent engaged in private trade to India under a license from the EIC. She had left St Helena, bound for England, on 5 March 1815, in company with Indian Oak and the whaler Admiral Colpoys.

Lady Nugent sailed from Calcutta 9 March 1817. Chief Officer Andrew Haig described her as "Master: Captain Robert Swanston; a Ship of 514 Register Tons". She arrived at Bombay on 16 May, Malacca on 16 August, Macau on 5 September, and Whampoa on 9 September. She left Macau 16 November, and arrived the Sand Heads, Hooghly River Delta, on 25 December 1817. After refitting at Fort Gloster, she arrived Calcutta late March 1818. (Tasmanian Archives and Heritage Office document CRO83/1/1.)

=== EIC voyage #1 (1819) ===
Captain R. Swanston sailed from Madras, bound for London. Lady Nugent left Madras on 20 April 1819. She reached St Helena on 17 September, and arrived at Spithead on 26 November.

When Ajax, Scott, master, originally bound from Calcutta to Malta, was condemned in March 1822, her cargo was transhipped on Lady Nugent. At the time, Lady Nugent was expected to sail from Calcutta in May.

On 18 May 1822, a hurricane at 15°N 88°E caught Lady Nugent. She survived after having jettisoned a third of her cargo, but had to put back to Bengal. She had five feet of water in her hold, which ruined more than another third of the cargo. This same storm had caused Charles Mills to founder with the loss of most of the people on board.

Captain Robert Boon was Lady Nugent's master in 1823.

On 12 May 1824, Lady Nugent was at the Cape of Good Hope. The boats of HMS Tartar and HNMS Dageraad towed her into Simon's Bay after Lady Nugent got into a “perilous state” on her way from Bengal and Madras.

In 1825, Lady Nugent became a "Free Trader".

On 15 March 1825, Lady Nugent was scheduled to leave London to sail via Plymouth bound for Madras and Calcutta under the command of Charles C Copin. She was described in The Times of 8th March 1825 as a “fine teak ship…with surgeon on board”

=== EIC voyage #2 (1825–1826) ===
Between 26 March 1825 and 28 October 1826, Lady Nugent sailed to Madras and Bengal. Captain William Wimble.

On 19 June 1827, Lady Nugent put into Portsmouth for repairs after having developed leaks on her way to Bengal. She may have had to transship her cargo on Tyne.

=== EIC voyage #3 (1829–1830) ===
Captain John Wimble sailed from Portsmouth on 15 July 1829, bound for Bengal. Lady Nugent arrived at Calcutta on 7 December. Homeward bound, she was at Kedgeree on 30 March 1830, and arrived at Gravesend on 22 September.

=== EIC voyage #4 (1831–1832) ===
Between 20 March 1831 and 1832, Lady Nugent sailed to Madras and Bengal.

=== Convicts to New South Wales (1833–1834) ===
Captain Joseph Henry Fawcett sailed from Sheerness on 4 December 1834, and arrived at Sydney on 9 April 1835. She had embarked 286 male convicts, two of whom died on the voyage. She left for Batavia in May.

=== Convicts to Van Diemen's Land (1836) ===
Captain Fawcett sailed Lady Nugent from Sheerness on 14 July 1836. She sailed via the Cape and arrived at Hobart Town on 11 November. She had embarked 286 male convicts, none of whom died on the voyage.

=== Emigrants to New Zealand ===
Lloyd's Register for 1841 (published in 1840), shows Lady Nugent's master changing from Fawcett to Santry, and her owner from Somes to Haviside. Her trade changed from London, to London—New Zealand.

The New Zealand Company chartered Lady Nugent in 1840. Captain James Santry sailed on 21 October 1840, bound for Wellington with 263 emigrants. She arrived at 17 March 1841. On 6 August, Lady Nugent arrived at Calcutta from New Zealand and Madras.

Lloyd's Register for 1846 shows Santry as master, Haviside, owner, and trade: London. It also shows that she was rebuilt in 1843.

Between 7 December 1849 and 26 March 1850, Captain John Parsons transported emigrants to New Zealand.

On 30 May 1851, Lady Nugent sailed from London to Lyttelton under Captain John Parsons with Canterbury Association settlers, arriving on 18 September. She then sailed to Nelson, reaching there on 23 October. She arrived at Port Jackson from New Zealand on 7 December. By this time, her master was David Frazer.

== Fate ==
On 10 May 1854, Lady Nugent sailed from Madras for Rangoon, with Lt. Col. Johnstone, four other officers and 350 other ranks, all of the 25th Regiment of Madras Native Infantry, as well as 20 women and children, and a crew of 34. During her voyage Lady Nugent foundered in a hurricane with the loss of everyone on board.
