= Admiral Colpoys (1792 ship) =

Former South American-British ship

History

Great Britain
- Name: Admiral Colpoys
- Namesake: Admiral Sir John Colpoys
- Builder: South America
- Launched: 1792
- Acquired: c.1799, or 1800 as a prize
- Fate: Wrecked 1817

General characteristics
- Tons burthen: 250, 272, or 274 (bm)
- Sail plan: Full-rigged ship
- Complement: 33
- Armament: Merchantman:4 × 9-pounder guns; Slaver:12 × 9-pounder guns; Letter of Marque: 12 × 9-pounder guns; Sealer: 6 guns

Admiral Colpoys was a vessel built in South America in 1792, that the British captured circa 1800. Her new name refers to Admiral John Colpoys. She first traded between London and the Caribbean. Between 1802 and 1807, she made three voyages as a slave ship in the triangular trade in enslaved people. After the abolition of the British slave trade in 1807, she became a merchant vessel. Then in 1813, new owners turned her towards seal hunting. She made four complete voyages to South Georgia before she was wrecked in 1817, during her fifth seal hunting voyage.

== Merchantman ==
Admiral Colpoys first appears in Lloyd's Register for 1801, with Disney, master, Atkins & Co. as owners, and London-Bermuda as trade. The same entry shows her master as changing to G. Musson, and her trade to London-Jamaica. Lloyd's Register for 1802, continues to show Musson and Jamaica.

== Enslaving ==
Owners Thomas King & Co. deployed Admiral Colpoys on three enslaving voyages. (Note: Thomas King & Co. may have been based in Bristol, but she did not sail from there.) For each of her voyages Admiral Colpoys went to the Gold Coast to gather her human cargo.

1st voyage transporting enslaved people (1801–1802): under George Adams, master, Admiral Colpoys left London on 17 November 1801. In 1801, 147 vessels left English ports, bound on voyages to transport enslaved people; 23 sailed from London.

Admiral Colpoys delivered 287 enslaved people to Havana in September 1802. She left Havana on 14 November, and arrived back at Portsmouth on 22 December, after a voyage of five weeks and three days.

2nd voyage transporting enslaved people (1804–1805): under Henry Coley, master, Admiral Colpoys left London on 2 October 1804, bound for the Gold Coast. In 1804, 147 vessels left English ports, bound on voyages to transport enslaved people; 18 sailed from London.

Admiral Colpoys started acquiring captives at Cape Coast Castle and then Accra, beginning on 7 February 1805. She delivered 303 captives to Demerara on 10 June. She left Demerara on 26 July, and arrived back at London on 30 September.

3rd voyage transporting enslaved people (1807–1808): on 20 January 1807, Richard Coaley received a letter of marque for Admiral Colpoys. She sailed from London on 9 February 1807, bound for the Gold Coast. She acquired captives at Cape Coast Castle, Lagos, and Tantumquerry. She arrived at Demerara on 30 September with 293 captives.

The Essequebo and Demarary Royal Gazette for 3 October 1807, had two items concerning Admiral Colpoys.

"The Subscribers inform their Friends who Commissioned them to Purchase Negroes in Barbados, that they have received by the Ship Admiral Colpoys, Capt. Coley, 200 Very Prime Gold-Coast Slaves, which they will be ready to deliver on Saturday the 10th of October, at 12 o'Clock. William King & Co., Cumingsburg, 30th September 1807."

"The Subscribers beg leave to inform such of their Friends as Commissioned them to import Negroes, that they have just received 90 Prime Young Gold-Coast Slaves, being part of the Cargo of the Ship Admiral Colpoys from cape coast, last from Barbados, which will be ready for delivery on Saturday the 10th Instant, at the Store of John Madden, Esq. Colin Macrae, & Underwood, Johnson & Co.. Demerary, 3d October 1807."

Admiral Colpoys arrived back at London 24 April 1808.

== Merchantman ==
In 1807, the British Parliament passed an Act for the abolition of the slave trade. However this act merely imposed fines that were insufficient to deter entrepreneurs from engaging in such a profitable business. A number of Liverpool slave traders continued the trade via various subterfuges (see, for example, the case of Donna Marianna).

Lloyd's Register for 1808, still shows Admiral Colpoys with R. Cooly, master, King & Co., owners, and trade London-Africa. So does Lloyd's Register for 1809; it also shows a new master, Venables, replacing Cooly. However, Lloyd's Register was only as accurate as the owners of the vessels chose to make it by updating their information. It is therefore not clear whether Thomas King & Co. continued enslaving or not. Given that she retained her name and all subsequent merchant voyages had her sailing to British Guiana, she most probably did not.

Lloyd's Register for 1810, shows Admiral Colpoys with Venables, master, King & Co., owners, and trade London-Demerara.

The Slave Trade Felony Act 1811 was passed to stiffen the legal sanctions against those engaged in the slave trade. Transgression became a felony with a punishment that could involve imprisonment or transportation.

== Seal hunting ==
Lloyd's Register for 1813, continues the entries from 1810, but shows a new master, Toderage, replacing Venables. Toderage appears to be a misspelling for Todrig. All of Admiral Colpoys's sealing voyages saw her sailing to South Georgia while under the command of James Todrig, and under the ownership of "Todrig", or James and Francis Todrig. (Note: For a scholarly history of early sealing in the Falklands see Dickinson. It includes a mention in passing of the loss of Admiral Colpoys.)

On her first whaling voyage, Admiral Colpoys left England on 2 July 1813, and returned on 31 May 1814.

On her second, she left on 21 July 1814, and returned on 9 May 1815.

On her third, she left in 1815, and returned on 23 March 1816, with 400 casks and 12 skins (presumably seal). She had left St Helena on 5 March 1815, in company with Indian Oak and Lady Nugent, both trading with India under a license from the EIC.

On her fourth voyage, she left in 1816, and returned on 27 January 1817.

== Fate ==
On her fifth whaling voyage, Admiral Colpoys sailed to South Georgia via Santiago, Cape Verde. She was lost on 28 November 1817, when an iceberg floated into the bay in which she was anchored and pushed her onshore. Her crew was saved.

The crew was able to save 700 barrels of elephant oil that were transshipped to England. However, 800 barrels of elephant oil were lost. Another account reports that the iceberg severed Admiral Colpoys's cable; attempts to break up the iceberg using cannon fire were unable to prevent Admiral Colpoys from drifting on to the rocks. Francis Todrig, in King George, retrieved the crew. (Note: Thomas W. Smith, a crewman aboard Admiral Colpoys provided a fuller account of the voyage and her loss, though his account suffers from some minor inaccuracies. He names his vessel Admiral, Coalpoise, and sets the loss in 1818.)
