= Indian Oak (1813 ship) =

UK merchant ship (1813–1840)

History

United Kingdom
- Builder: James Peter Fearon, Cochin
- Launched: 23 September 1813, or 1814, or 1817
- Fate: Wrecked 14 August 1840
- Notes: "Indian Oak" was a common term for teak, and Indian Oak was built of teak.

General characteristics
- Tons burthen: Old Act: 400, or 445, or 465, or 472, or 47213/94, or 476 (bm); New Act (post 1836): 569 (bm)
- Length: 114 ft 9 in (35.0 m)
- Beam: 30 ft 10 in (9.4 m)

Indian Oak was launched at Cochin, probably in 1813. She then traded between India and Britain. From circa 1824, she operated as a "country ship" trading primarily in the Indian Ocean. Notable events included arson by the crew, a dispute between her master and the government of Mauritius, transport of 200 labourers from Bengal to Mauritius, and a mutiny that resulted in the cutting and maiming of her master. She was wrecked in August 1840, after having delivered troops to Chusan for the First Opium War.

== Career ==
In 1813, the EIC lost its monopoly on the trade between India and Britain. British ships were then free to sail between India or the Indian Ocean and the United Kingdom under a license from the EIC.

On 6 May 1815, Indian Oak was off the Isle of Wight. She had sailed from Bengal on 9 December 1814, and from St Helena on 5 March 1815. She left St Helena in company with Lady Nugent and the whaler Admiral Colpoys.

On 26 August 1815, Indian Oak, Fearon, master, sailed from Gravesend, bound for Bengal. On 31 January 1816, she arrived at Madras, and on 14 February, she arrived at Bengal.

Arson: On 16 June 1816, Indian Oak, Penterby, master, was anchored about a mile from Saugor preparing to sail from Bengal for London when a fire broke out forward. It was quickly extinguished and proved to have destroyed only a few bags of cotton. The fire was the result of sabotage by three of the crew who wanted to leave the ship and so need to delay her sailing. Apparently one had thrust a cheroot into a bale of cotton. The three seacunnies involved were to be sent to Calcutta, from the New Anchorage, to stand trial. (Note: The three men were found guilty and were sentenced to four years imprisonment.)

Indian Oak was expected to sail on 23 June. Indian Oak, Benworthy, master, arrived at Liverpool on 24 December. She had sailed from Bengal on 19 June, and from Île de France on 21 September.

Year	Master	Owner	Trade	Source
1816	J.Fearon	Fearon & Co.	London–India	LR
1818	Pemborthy	Fearon & Co.	Liverpool–Bengal	LR
1825	Pemborthy	Fearon & Co.	Liverpool–Bengal	LR

Indian Oak left the Calcutta pilot 24 April 1818. First Officer Andrew Haig described her as "Captain Guthrie; a Ship of 477 Tons Burthen; carries a large Cargo & sails remarkably well". After passing to the South of New Holland (Australia), New Zealand, and in sight of the Bounty’s Islands, she sailed as far as 57 degrees South in the dead of Winter. She arrived at Valparaiso on 28 July 1818, having lost two lascars (Indian sailors) to frostbite.

Indian Oak appeared in the Calcutta registry in 1819, with T. Guthrie, master, and J.P. Fearon, owner. In March 1819 she was at Callao.

Indian Oak was last listed in LR in 1825. She appeared on the Calcutta registry in 1824, with J. Reid, master, and Palmer and Co., owner. Reid sailed her for Penang, Malacca, Sincapore, and Batavia.

Indian Oak served as a transport during the First Anglo-Burmese War (1824–1826).

On her release from transport service, Indian Oak (Ried or Reid, or Read), master, traded around India and with Mauritius, Muscat, and Rangoon, and South America.

In November 1830, Indian Oak, A. Bane, master, sailed for the Persian Gulph. Over the next two years she was at Coplopo, Kopang, Mauritius, Mergui, the Red Sea, and Rangoon.

In June 1833 Indian Oak, E. Worthington, master, was at Covelong.

Mauritius incident: On 26 April 1834, Indian Oak, Worthington, master, arrived at Port Louis, Mauritius, from Calcutta. There Worthington objected to an arbitrary decision by Mr. Cunningham, the collector of customs, who proceeded to have all manner of private goods on Indian Oak, but not belonging to Captain Worthington, seized. Before she could sail from Mauritius, Captain Worthington had to post a fine of £500. When he returned to Calcutta, Captain Worthington published his account of the affair in the India Gazette of 22 July. On his return to Mauritius in October he submitted on 27 October to the Colonial secretary, for transmission to the governor, a copy of the article as well as a narrative updating to the last day the narrative of facts. On 4 November, he was ordered to attend a hearing in which he would have to show cause for why he should not be imprisoned for two years and have to pay a fine of $1000 for having defamed and injured, the government, the Court of Admiralty, the Judge of Admiralty, the collector of customs, and the administration of customs. Two days before the hearing the Mauritian authorities arrested Captain Worthington and held him until he posted a $1000 bond. At the hearing, after several appeals, Captain Worthington was sentenced to three months imprisonment, but was subsequently released. It was noted that the Mr. Blackburn, the chief justice of the Court of Appeal, was one of the parties Captain Worthington had accused.

Later in 1834, Indian Oak, Durward, master, sailed between India and Ceylon. In 1835, Worthington was again her master, sailing her to Rangoon and Mauritius.

In August Indian Oak was under the command of R. Rayne, who sailed her to Mauritius. Captain Worthington later resumed command and continued to sail her to Mauritius. In late 1836, Captain Rayne sailed her to Mauritius and Rangoon.

Indentured labourers: A letter dated 22 April 1837, from the Colonial Secretary of Mauritius to the Chief Secretary of Bengal, complained of the trade in indentured labourers being carried from Bengal to Mauritius in deplorable conditions and without concern for the labourers' medical needs. (Note: The Slavery Abolition Act 1833 had abolished slavery within the British Empire and plantation owners, especially in the sugar plantations of Mauritius and the West Indies, turned to indentured laborours from India to replace the slaves.) Three vessels had had to go into quarantine on their arrival because of dysentery and cholera, Indian Oak being the least affected. Only six of the 200 labourers on board had died on the voyage. The worst was Adelaide, where 24 of 72 labourers had died. The vessels also carried large cargoes of rice that reduced the room the labourers had at their disposal.

Indian Oak had sailed from Calcutta on 28 November, with 200 males, five women, and a male child. All were classified as labourers. Of the six men who died, three died in the water. Ten jumped overboard on 3 June, of whom nine were saved; one was believed to have gone under the stern of the ship. On the late evening of 7 June, one man jumped overboard and swam away from the ship, which was near Saugor, but because of the flood tide some 16 miles from the nearest reachable shore; on the advice of the pilot, Rayne was unwilling to risk a boat crew to attempt to save him. On 9 June, one coolie was discovered missing; he had told his wife he was going up on deck and it was believed that he had fallen overboard. (Note: He had a wife and two sons aboard. It was believed that he had gone on deck to "ease himself" and the first that Rayne knew of the matter was when the wife came on the quarterdeck and reported him missing. The weather at the time was severe. In all, Rayne transported some 800 collies over several voyages.)

Mutiny: On 10 February 1838, Indian Oak, Rayne, master, had to put back to Mauritius in consequence of a mutiny on board. Thirteen of the crew were tried before a special Court of Admiralty and convicted of cutting and maiming Captain Rayne with intent to murder. The governor, who was president of the board, commuted their death penalty sentences.

Captain Rayne's injuries, were clearly not severe enough to end his career. On 8 May, Indian Oak, Rayne, master, arrived in the Hooghly River from Madras and Port Louis.

A letter from Bombay dated 13 January 1840, reported that the British East India Company (EIC) had chartered a number of vessels to carry coal, provisions, and troops to China in support of the British expedition in the First Opium War. Indian Oak was one of the vessels so chartered. She carried eight officers and 134 men of the Cameronians. She arrived at Penang on 18 April; one man had died of cholera. On 6 May, she sailed for Singapore.

== Fate ==
Indian Oak left Chusan on 10 August, after the capture of Chusan. On 14 August, she was wrecked about 10 miles north of Napakiang (Naha) at Great Loochow Island (Okinawa). The Okinawans built a junk for the crew and passengers from Indian Oak that was given the name Loochoo. HMS Cruizer and Nimrod arrived on 16 September. Cruizer left soon after with dispatches. Nimrod, and Loochoo, which was carrying the people from Indian Oak, sailed on 28 September and arrived at Chusan on 5 October.
