= List of ships of the line of France =

This is a list of French ships of the line of the period 1621–1870 (plus some from the period before 1621). Battlefleet units in the French Navy (Marine Royale before the French Revolution established a republic) were categorised as vaisseaux (literally "vessels") as distinguished from lesser warships such as frigates (frégates). The vaisseaux were classified according to size and/or firepower into a series of Rangs (ranks), roughly equivalent to the system of Rates used by the British Navy, although these did not correspond exactly. By 1671 there was a system of five Rangs, which officially pertained for over a century; the first three of these Rangs comprised the battlefleet vaisseaux, while the Fourth and Fifth Rangs comprised the larger frigates ("frégates-vaisseaux" or simply "frégates"). In practice, by the early decades of the 18th century the formal ranking system among the vaisseaux had in practice been overtaken by a division based on the number of carriage guns borne in practice by individual ships.

The article is divided into sections according to the Head of State at the time, which names are provided as chronological references.

Note that throughout this article the term "-pounder" refers to French pre-metric units of weight (livres), which were almost 8% greater than UK/US units of the same name; every other maritime power likewise established its own system of weights and each country's 'pound' was different from that of every other nation. Similarly, French pre-metric units of length (pieds and pouces) were 6.575% longer than equivalent UK/US units of measurement; the pre-metric French foot was equivalent to 324.8394 mm, whereas the UK/US foot equalled 304.8 mm. These differences should be taken into account in any calculations based on the units given below.

== Valois-Angoulême dynasty (1515 to 1589) ==
Francis I was the first of the five French Kings of the Valois-Angoulême dynasty, who reigned from 1515 to 1589:

- Francis I (1 January 1515 – 31 March 1547)
- Henry II (1 April 1547 – 10 July 1559) – second son of Francis I
- Francis II (10 July 1559 – 5 December 1560) – eldest son of Henry II
- Charles IX (5 December 1560 – 30 May 1574) – third son of Henry II
- Henry III (30 May 1574 – 2 August 1589) (assassinated) – fourth son of Henry II

The application of the Salic law meant that with the extinction of the Valois in the male line, the Bourbons succeeded to the throne as descendants of Louis IX. Very few of the names of French ships of this era are known.

- Grande Française (1533)
- Caraquon (1544)

== Henri IV (1589 to 1610) ==
- Lune (1608) ex-Dutch Maan, built 1604 at Amsterdam
- Saint Louis (1609)

== Louis XIII (1610 to 1643) ==
The first seven years of this reign were under the Regency of Marie de Médicis, the consort of Henri IV – Louis XIII's father, who had been assassinated in 1610. Following the Siege of Saint-Martin-de-Ré and the Siege of La Rochelle, and in line with his general efforts to enhance the prestige and status of France in Europe, Cardinal Richelieu had a number of warships purchased from Holland, and eventually built in France by Holland-instructed French engineers. The largest of these early ships of the line, such as the famous 72-gun Couronne launched in 1638, would mount a number of guns comparable to later units of the 18th and 19th century, but the brunt of these ships would mount between 20 and 40 guns. The artillery was also comparatively lighter: the Couronne mounted 18-pounder long guns on her main battery, where any of the numerous 74-gun ships of the line that formed the backbone of the Navy from the late 18th century would mount 36-pounder long guns and 18-pounders would become common on frigates.

=== Ships of the Line ("vaisseaux") ===
- Ours d'Or (purchased 1618 at Middlebourg) – not mentioned after 1624
- Dutch-built vessels
  - Pellicorne (or Notre Dame de La Victoire or Saint Marie) (1619) – condemned 1640
  - Saint Esprit (1619) – not mentioned after 1624
  - Galion de Guise (May 1620) – Flagship of the Flotte du Levant 1621–22; accidentally burnt (in combat by French fireship) at Barcelona on 2 July 1642
  - Grand Galion de Malte (loaned May 1621) – returned to the Order of Malta in 1623
- Saint Jean (1621) – disarmed 1637
- Saint Michel (June 1621) – not mentioned after 1623
- Vessels purchased in January 1625 at Blavet from the Order of the Milice Chrétienne; on 18 January all five were captured by Huguenot forces in a raid, but were retaken or destroyed by the King's forces later in 1625
  - Saint Basile (1625) – disposal unknown
  - Saint François (1625) – destroyed in action 17 September 1625
  - Saint Jean (1625) – converted to fireship 1640
  - Saint Louis de Nevers (1625) – disposal unknown
  - Saint Michel (1625) – deleted 1629

When Richelieu decided to renew the French Royal Navy in 1625, he began by ordering a number of warships to be built in Holland, as the French shipbuilding industry was not at that date capable of constructing them in sufficient quantity. However, in the interim, before these new ships could be built, he arranged to fill the gap by leasing or hiring a number of Dutch and English ships. In June 1625 he procured twenty Dutch warships, of which one was lost in action on 16 July and another on 17 September; the remaining eighteen ships were returned to the Dutch on 10 March 1626. In July 1625 he also hired the English Second rate warship Vanguard, and in August added six ships hired from the English East India Company; all these were returned to their owners on 26 May 1626. As these were never at any date owned by the French, they are excluded from the list below.

- Corail (1626 in Holland) – not mentioned after 1639
- Europe (1626 in Holland) – condemned 1645
- Fortune (1626 in Holland) – sold January 1650
- Hercule (1626 in Holland) – deleted by 1635
- Licorne (1626 in Holland) – lost off Sardinia 1643
- Vierge 48 (purchased) – Captured by the Rochellais, blew up at Ile de Ré on 17 September 1625
- Espérance de Dieu (1627)
- Grand Saint Louis (1627)
- Navire du Roi 52 guns (1627) – sold in December 1649 and broken up 1650
- Vaisseau de la Reine 40 guns (1627) – wrecked in July 1639 off Morbihan.
- Neptune (1628) – a frigate (dragon)
- Saint Charles (1628)
- Cygne (1629)
- Marguerite du Ponant (1629)
- Madeleine de Brest (1635)
- Saint Louis de Saint Jean de Luz – 3rd Rank ship of 26 guns (1636) – built at Saint-Jean-de Luz (near Biarritz)
- Couronne 72 guns (launched 1632 or 1633) – taken to pieces 1643 – 1645
- Amsterdam-built vessels, all begun in 1637 and launched in February 1638
  - Cardinal 42 guns (1638) – taken to pieces in 1662
  - Faucon 26 guns (1638) – deleted May 1661
  - Triomphe 30 guns (1638) – taken to pieces 1662
  - Triton 26 guns (1638) – captured by the English in September 1652
  - Victoire 34 guns (1638) – sank off Naples in October 1654
  - Vierge 34 guns (1638) – wrecked at Messina on 22 November 1650
- Dauphin 24 guns (launched 17 March 1638 at Le Havre) – condemned May 1661
- Lion Couronné 28 or 36 guns (1641) – captured by the Spanish 17 June 1651
- Sourdis 34 guns (1641) – deleted May 1661
- Lune class. Two sisters of 36–46 guns built at Indret from 1640 to 1643 by Jean de Werf
  - Lune (1641) – sank off Toulon in November 1664
  - Soleil (1642) – renamed Hercule in June 1671, then Marquis a month later – sold August 1672
- Léopard class. Two sisters of 28–30 guns built at Indret from 1640 to 1644 by Jean de Werf
  - Léopard (1642) – delivered to the Spanish in April 1651 by mutinous crew
  - Tigre (1642) – sank off Sardinia 23 September 1664

=== Captured or otherwise acquired from foreign navies in the Louis XIII era ===
Note only prizes put into service with the Marine Royale are included here.

- Lion d'Or 24–32 guns (captured in September 1625 from the Huguenots at La Rochelle) – captured by Spanish galleys at Collioure in May 1641.
- Vaisseau Anglais (English merchantman captured in October 1627) – probably sold 1628
- Saint Georges de Londres 24 guns (English merchantman St George captured on 17 July 1636) – probably returned to the English
- Trois Fanaux d'Amsterdam (Dutch merchantman captured 1637) – disposal unknown.
- Four Spanish vessels captured at Passaje by Sourdis in July 1638
  - Almirante 36 guns (1638) – struck 1650
  - D'Oquendo 38 guns (1638) – burnt by the English in 1650
  - Maquedo 40 guns (1638) – burnt by accident in April 1644
  - Olivarez 28 guns (1638) – condemned and struck 1648
- Amiral de Galice (Spanish galleon captured on 11 June 1636 at Laredo) – probably renamed Vice-amiral de Biscaye and burnt by accident in April 1644
- Dantzig (Prussian vessel captured October 1640) – probably sold 1649
- Four Spanish vessels captured in June 1642 to September 1643
  - Saint Thomas d'Aquin (1642) – deleted May 1661
  - Saint Paul (1642) – sank in the Mediterranean 1648
  - Saint Jacques de Dunkerque (1643) – sold in January 1650
  - Saint Jacques du Portugal (1644) – deleted 1648
- Grand Anglais 34 guns (English merchantman captured August 1643) – sold in January 1650

== Louis XIV (1643 to 1715) ==
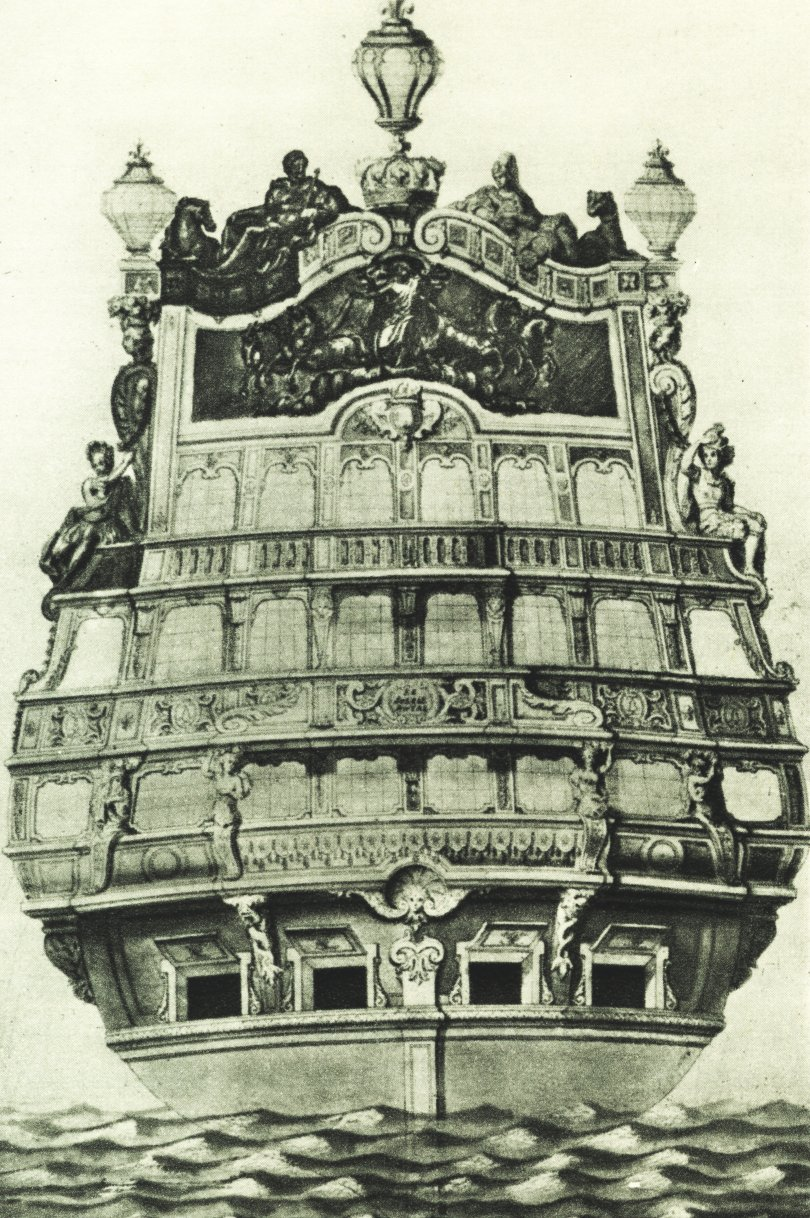
Aft of Soleil Royal, by Jean Bérain the Elder

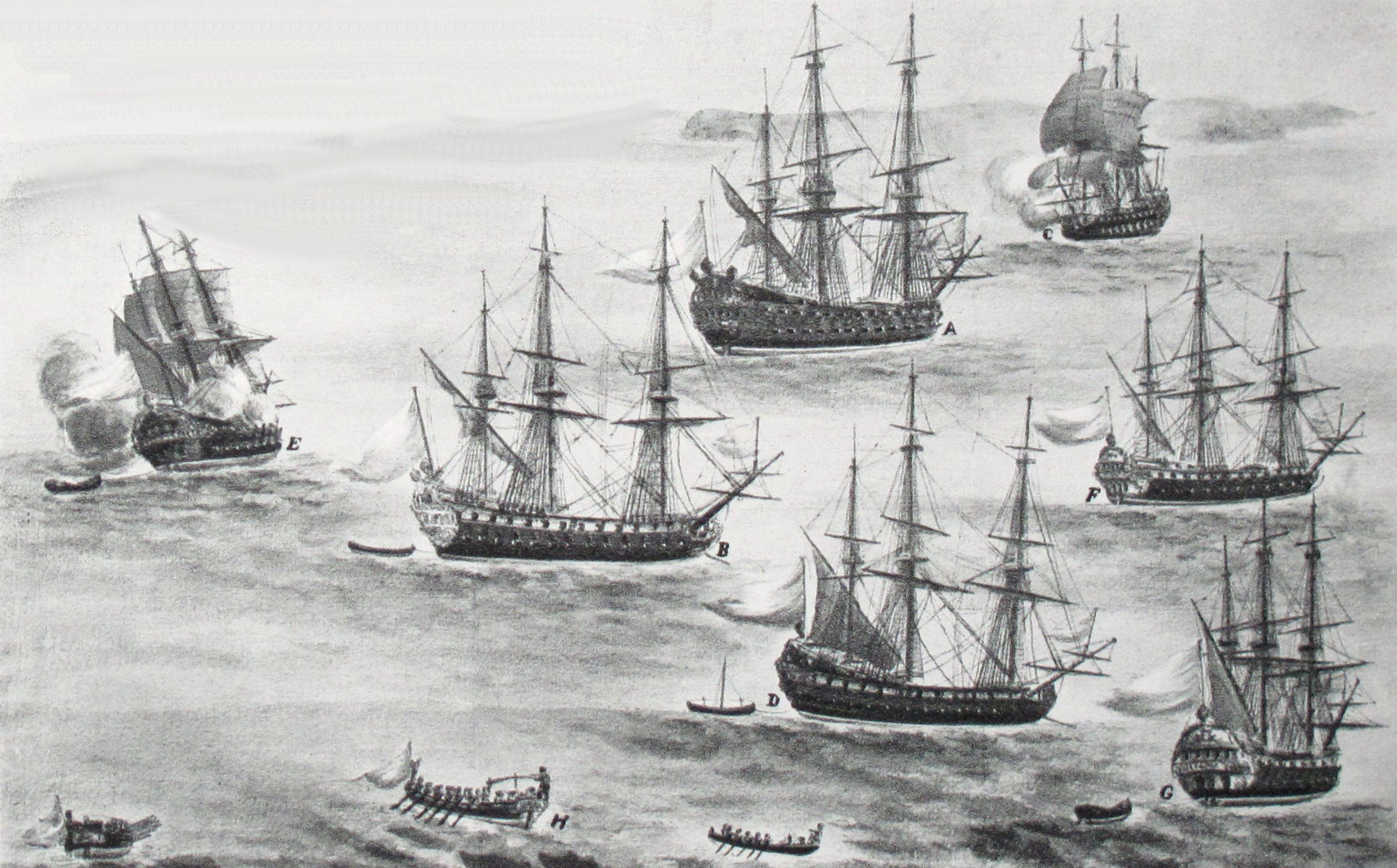
Naval parade organised by Maurepas

The first eight years of this reign were under the Regency of Anne of Austria, the consort of Louis XIII, while French politics were dominated by Cardinal Jules Mazarin, who served as Chief Minister from 1642, and Louis XIV did not achieve personal rule until the death of Cardinal Mazarin in March 1661.

The French rating system was historically a division into three Ranks, but a new system of four Ranks was provisionally created in 1669; however a new system quickly replaced this in 1671. Earlier vessels are shown under the rating they were given in 1671 – in the case of vessels deleted prior to 1671, these are included according to the rate they would have been given in 1671 had they not been deleted. Under this new system, French major warships were from 1671 divided into five ranks or "Rangs"; ships of the line (vaisseaux) were divided into the highest three ranks.

The original rating system was thoroughly reformed under Jean-Baptiste Colbert's administration two years later, on 24 June 1671, and the overwhelming majority of French warships underwent name changes at that date; vessels are listed below under their original name at time of launching or acquisition, even if they subsequently were better known by the name they were given later.

Vessels of the Fourth and Fifth Ranks were categorised as frigates (frégates or frégates-vaisseaux) of the 1st Order and 2nd Order respectively; light frigates (frégates légères) and even smaller vessels were excluded from the rating system.

=== First Rank Ships ("vaisseaux de Premier Rang") ===
From 1670, the First Rank could be categorised as ships of the line carrying more than 70 carriage guns (although other factors also played a part in determining what Rank a ship was given); in 1690 this was limit was effectively risen to ships carrying 80 or more guns.

==== Vaisseaux de Premier Rang Extraordinaire ====
The largest and most heavily armed First Rank ships, effectively those carrying 100 carriage guns or more, were placed in a sub-category of Vaisseaux de Premier Rang Extraordinaire. Only a few of these were built, but they always provided the flagships of the two Fleets – the Flotte du Levant (on the Mediterranean coast of France) and the Flotte du Ponant (on the Atlantic and Channel coasts). They were all full three-deckers, i.e. with three full-length gun decks, with the uppermost of these surmounted by an armed forecastle, quarterdeck and poop.

- Royal Louis 104 guns (designed and built by Rodolphe Gédéon, launched 1 February 1668 at Toulon) – renamed Royal Louis Vieux 1692 and broken up 1697. Nominally assigned 120 guns, but never carried more than 104.
- Dauphin Royal 100, later 104 guns (designed and built by François Pomet, launched 29 March 1668 at Toulon) – broken up 1700
- Royal Duc 104 guns (designed and built by Laurent Hubac, launched December 1668 at Brest) – renamed Reine in June 1671 and broken up 1688
- Soleil Royal 106, later 110 guns (designed and built by Laurent Hubac, launched 13 December 1669 at Brest) – burnt by the English in an action at Cherbourg in June 1692
- Victorieux 108 guns (designed and built by François Pomet, probably launched in 1679 at Rochefort) – broken up 1685 (badly built and never brought into service)
- Royal Louis 110 guns (designed and built by François Coulomb snr, launched 22 September 1692 at Toulon) – broken up 1727
- Foudroyant 104 guns (designed and built by Étienne Hubac, launched 24 December 1692 at Brest) – exchanged names with Soleil Royal in March 1693 (see below), broken up 1714
- Terrible 100/104 guns (designed and built by Blaise Pangalo, launched 21 February 1693 at Brest) – broken up 1714
- Foudroyant 104 guns (designed and built by Blaise Pangalo, launched 14 November 1693 at Brest) – originally to have been named Soleil Royal, but exchanged names with Foudroyant in March 1693 (before work on her began), and broken up 1714

==== Vaisseaux de Premier Rang Ordinaire ====
While the smaller First Rank ships also had three full-length gun decks, the uppermost of these before 1690 generally carried carriage guns only on the forward section and on the after section of that deck, with a section between them in the waist of the ship where no guns were mounted (and no gunports fitted). These ships had no forecastle or poop, so that the two sections of the upper gun deck served the function of forecastle and quarterdeck, while the nominal quarterdeck was short and served in effect the function of a poop.

All First Rank ships built from 1689 (until 1740) had three full-length gun decks, usually plus a number of smaller carriage guns mounted on the gaillards (i.e. the quarterdeck, forecastle and possibly a poop deck). Some of the earlier ships built before 1689 received extra guns and gunports fitted in the waist section of their upper deck around 1689, to bring them up to 80 guns or more.

- Vendôme 72, later 66 guns (designed and built by Laurent Hubac, launched Spring 1651 at Brest) – classed as First Rank in 1669; renamed Victorieux in June 1671 but hulked in the following month and taken to pieces in 1679. In 1660 the 72-gun Vendôme was the sole ship which met the criteria of carrying more than 70 guns, and she retained this First Rank status in spite of being later reduced to fewer than 70 guns.
- Saint Philippe 78, later 84 guns (designed and built by Rodolphe Gédéon, launched 3 February 1663 at Toulon) – classed as 1st Rank in 1669; burnt by the English in the Battle of La Hogue in June 1692
- Monarque 84 guns (designed and built by Laurent Coulomb, launched 28 April 1668 at Toulon) – broken up 1700
- Île de France 74/80 guns (designed and built by Louis Audibert, launched 16 February 1669 at Toulon) – renamed Lys in June 1671 and broken up 1691
- Couronne 80/82 guns (designed and built by Laurent Hubac, launched 18 February 1669 at Brest) – broken up in 1712
- Paris 72/80 guns (designed and built by Jean Serrin, launched 13 March 1669 at Toulon) – renamed Royale Thérèse in June 1671 and broken up in 1692
- Henri 80 guns (designed and built by Jean-Pierre Brun, launched April 1669 at Tonnay-Charente) – renamed Souverain in June 1671, then renamed Admirable in June 1678
- Sceptre 80, later 84 guns (designed and built by Laurent Coulomb, launched 11 February 1670 at Toulon) – broken up 1692
- Magnanime 70, later 76/80 guns (designed by Rodolphe Gédéon and built by Charles Audibert, launched 30 August 1673 at Marseille) – driven ashore and burnt in the Battle of Marbella in March 1705
- Admirable 80/84 guns (designed and built by Laurent Hubac, launched 1678 at Brest) – renamed Souverain in June 1678 and broken up 1706
- Grand 84/88 guns (designed and built by Honoré Malet, launched October 1680 at Rochefort) – broken up 1716 or 1717. This vessel was originally classed as a Second Rank ship of 80 guns, but was raised to the First Rank in 1690.
- Magnifique 84 guns (designed and built by François Chapelle, launched 12 April 1685 at Toulon) – burnt by the English in the Battle of La Hogue in June 1692. This vessel was originally classed as a Second Rank ship of 72 guns, but was raised to the First Rank in 1690.
- Conquérant 84 guns (designed and built by Blaise Pangalo, launched 10 August 1688 at Toulon) – rebuilt 1707. This vessel was originally classed as a Second Rank ship of 74 guns, but was raised to the First Rank in 1687.
- Intrépide 84 guns (designed and built by Honoré Malet, launched March 1690 at Rochefort) – broken up 1724.
- Saint Esprit 90 guns (designed and built by Blaise Pangalo, launched 24 May 1690 at Brest) – renamed Monarque in June 1690, and broken up 1717
- Victorieux 94, later 88 guns (designed and built by Honoré Malet, launched January 1691 at Rochefort) – broken up 1719
- Foudroyant class, designed and built by Blaise Pangalo.
  - Foudroyant 84/90 (launched 5 March 1691 at Brest) – burnt by the English in the Battle of la Hogue in June 1692
  - Merveilleux 80/90 (launched 19 November 1691 at Brest) – burnt by the English in the Battle of La Hogue in June 1692
- Orgueilleux 88, later 90 guns (designed and built by Laurent Coulomb, launched 29 March 1691 at Lorient) – broken up 1716–17
- Admirable 84 guns (designed and built by Laurent Coulomb, launched 10 September 1691 at Lorient) – burnt by the English in an action at Cherbourg in June 1692
- Sceptre class, designed and built by François Coulomb snr.
  - Sceptre 84/88 guns (launched 10 November 1691 at Toulon) – broken up 1718
  - Lis or Lys 84/88 guns (launched 17 December 1691 at Toulon) – driven ashore and burnt in the Battle of Marbella in March 1705
- Formidable 90 guns (designed and built by Étienne Hubac, launched 4 December 1691 at Brest) – broken up 1714
- Fulminant 98 guns (designed and built by Pierre Masson, launched December 1691 at Rochefort) – broken up 1719
- Ambitieux 92 guns (designed and built by Honoré Malet, launched December 1691 at Rochefort) – burnt by the English in the Battle of La Hogue in June 1692
- Vainqueur 84 guns (designed and built by Laurent and Pierre Coulomb, launched 24 February 1692 at Lorient) – broken up 1722
- Merveilleux 100, later 98 guns (designed and built by Blaise Pangalo, launched 22 November 1692 at Brest) – broken up 1712
- Magnifique 86 guns (designed and built by Honoré Malet, launched 23 November 1692 at Rochefort) – broken up 1716 or 1717
- Ambitieux 92 guns (designed and built by Honoré Malet and Jean Guichard, launched 5 December 1692 at Rochefort) – broken up 1713
- Admirable 96/90 guns (designed and built by Laurent Coulomb, launched 23 December 1692 at Lorient) – broken up 1716 or 1717
- Tonnant class, designed and built by François Coulomb snr.
  - Tonnant 90 guns (launched September 1693 at Toulon) – took part in the Battle of Málaga, sold to be broken up 1710
  - Saint Philippe 90/92 guns (launched October 1693 at Toulon) – took part in the Battle of Málaga, broken up 1714
- Triomphant 94/98 guns (designed and built by Laurent Coulomb, launched 1 October 1693 at Lorient) – broken up 1725 or 1726
- Fier 90/94 guns (designed and built by Honoré Malet and Pierre Masson, launched 1694 at Rochefort) – broken up 1713

=== Second Rank Ships ("vaisseaux de Deuxième Rang") ===
Before 1670, the Second Rank consisted of ships of the line carrying from 50 up to 64 carriage guns (although there were exceptions); from 1671 this comprised ships of between 62 and 68 guns; in 1683 this was comprised ships carrying from 64 to 76 guns (again with exceptions), and by 1710 even 64-gun ships had been reduced to the Third Rate. Most Second Rank ships were two-decked vessels, i.e. carrying two complete gundecks, usually plus a few smaller carriage guns mounted on the gaillards; however, the Second Rank initially also included numerous ships nominally described as three-deckers (although all had a break in the 3rd tier of guns or "upper deck") launched up until 1682, after which all three-deckers were First Rates; these three-deckers are listed below before the two-deckers.

Nominal three-decked ships:

- Bourbon 66 guns (designed and built by Jean-Pierre Brun, launched 22 November 1665 at Soubise) – renamed Éclatant (64 guns) in June 1671; deleted 1684
- Prince 64, later 70 guns (designed and built by Laurent Hubac, launched April 1666 at Brest) – renamed Sans Pareil in June 1671; wrecked 1679
- Frédéric 70/80 (designed and built by Mathias, launched early 1666 at Copenhagen – built by contract) – renamed Admirable in June 1671, broken up 1677
- Dutch-built class, all built by contract, ordered on 19 March 1666 and probably to a common design.
  - Conquérant 66/72 (launched November 1666 at Zaandam) – wrecked 1679
  - Courtisan 64/72 (launched December 1666 at Amsterdam) – renamed Magnifique in June 1671; hulked 1684 and broken up around 1693
  - Intrépide 66/76 (launched December 1666 at Zaandam) – renamed Grand in June 1671; broken up 1678
  - Invincible 64/74 (launched December 1666 at Amsterdam) – deleted 1681
  - Neptune 64/74 (launched December 1666 at Amsterdam) – renamed Illustre in June 1671; broken up 1698
  - Normand 66/72 (launched December 1666 at Amsterdam) – renamed Saint Louis in June 1671; broken up 1680
- Princesse 60, later 64 guns (designed and built by Jean-Pierre Brun, launched in May 1667 at Soubise) – renamed Triomphant in June 1671, then Constant in 1678; hulked as Vieux Constant 1690, deleted by 1704
- Charente 66 guns (designed and built by Jean Laure, launched in February 1669 at Rochefort) – renamed Belliqueux in June 1671, then Courtisan in June 1678 (although latter change never took effect); wrecked in the Caribbean on 11 May 1678.
- Fort 68, later 76 guns (designed and built by Jean Guichard, launched 11 April 1669 at Rochefort) – renamed Foudroyant in June 1671, broken up 1690
- Français 62/66 (designed and built by Laurent Hubac, launched 25 October 1669 at Brest) – renamed Glorieux in June 1671; burnt in action 1677
- Madame 70, later 74 guns (designed and built by Jean Guéouard, launched 28 February 1670 at Toulon) – renamed Pompeux in June 1671; hulked 1696, sold 1709
- Royale Thérèse 68, later 76 guns (designed and built by Rodolphe Gédéon, launched 4 March 1670 at Toulon) – renamed Saint Esprit in June 1671; condemned 1689 and sold 1692
- Terrible 68/70 (designed and built by Laurent Hubac, launched 19 September 1670 at Brest) – wrecked 1678
- Tonnant 64/66 (designed and built by Laurent Hubac, launched 19 September 1670 at Brest) – wrecked 1678
- Florissant class, designed and built by Rodolphe Gédéon. These ships were originally named Joli and Rubis respectively, but were renamed on 24 June 1671.
  - Joli 70/80 (launched 2 October 1670 at Toulon) – renamed Henri in June 1671; deleted 1686, sold 1687
  - Rubis 72/76 (launched 15 October 1670 at Toulon) – renamed Florissant in June 1671; hulked 1696, broken up after 1700
- Constant class, designed and built by Laurent Hubac. These ships were originally named Brave and Courtisan, but the first was renamed Constant in June 1675
  - Constant 74/76 (launched 20 June 1675 at Brest) – renamed Triomphant in June 1678; burnt by the English in an action at Cherbourg in June 1692
  - Courtisan 72/76 (launched 1676 at Brest) – renamed Belliqueux in June 1678; broken up 1708
- Terrible 72, later 76 guns (designed and built by Laurent Hubac; launched 1680 at Brest) – burnt by the English in the Battle of La Hogue in June 1692
- Tonnant class, designed and built by Laurent Hubac.
  - Tonnant 76 (launched August 1681 at Brest) – burnt by the English in the Battle of La Hogue in June 1692
  - Fier 76 (launched end 1682 at Brest) – burnt by the English in the Battle of La Hogue in June 1692

Two-decked ships:

- Superbe class, designed and built by François Pomet. These ships were originally named Faucon and Vermandois respectively, but were renamed on 24 June 1671.
  - Superbe 70/76 (launched June 1671 at Rochefort) – broken up 1687
  - Orgueilleux 70/76 (launched September 1671 at Rochefort) – broken up 1688
- Glorieux 60, later 64 guns (designed and built by Laurent Hubac, launched February 1679 at Brest) – broken up 1719
- Ardent 64 guns (designed and built by Étienne Salicon, launched 21 November 1680 at Le Havre) – Captured by the Dutch in the Battle of Marbella in March 1705
- Bourbon 62, later 64 guns (designed and built by Honoré Malet, launched 1683 at Rochefort) – burnt by the English in the Battle of La Hogue in June 1692
- Furieux 70, later 62 guns (designed and built by Blaise Pangalo, launched 23 October 1684 at Brest) - broken up 1727
- Courtisan 64 guns (designed and built by Honoré Malet, launched October 1686 at Rochefort) – Burnt by accident 1702
- Content 64, later 66 guns (designed and built by Blaise Pangalo, launched 23 December 1686 at Toulon) – captured by the English 1695
- Sérieux 64, later 58 guns (designed and built by Laurent Coulomb, launched 11 January 1687 at Toulon) – renamed Croissant 1688, then reverted to Sérieux 1689; broken up 1718
- Éclatant 70, later 68 guns (designed and built by Laurent Coulomb, launched 28 June 1688 at Toulon) – took part in the Battle of Málaga, lost in March 1713 in the Indian Ocean.
- Henri 68, later 70 guns (designed and built by Hendryck Houwens, launched 13 August 1688 at Dunkirk) – burnt 1736
- Brillant 64 guns (Designed and built by Étienne Salicon, launched January 1690 at Le Havre) – reclassed as 3rd Rang 1707; condemned 1719–22
- Aimable 70 guns (Designed and built by Pierre Masson, launched March 1690 at Rochefort) – burnt by accident 1715
- Superbe class, designed and built by François Coulomb snr.
  - Superbe 70 guns (launched March 1690 at Toulon) – captured and wrecked in the Battle of Vigo Bay in October 1702
  - Invincible 70 guns (launched April 1690 at Toulon) – condemned 1727 and broken up 1748
- Modified Superbe class, designed and built by François Coulomb snr.
  - Heureux 68/70 guns (launched November 1690 at Toulon) – took part in the Battle of Málaga, captured by the English 1710
  - Constant 68/70 guns (launched 28 November 1690 at Toulon) – deleted 1714
- Gaillard 64 guns (designed and built by Étienne Salicon, launched December 1690 at Le Havre) – burnt by the English in the Battle of La Hogue in June 1692
- Laurier class, designed and built by Pierre Masson
  - Laurier 60 guns (launched December 1690 at Bayonne) – scuttled at Toulon in July 1707; refloated but broken up
  - Sirène 60 guns (launched 14 January 1691 at Bayonne) – captured and wrecked in the Battle of Vigo Bay in October 1702
- Saint Esprit 76, later 74 guns (designed and built by Jean Guichard, launched early 1691 at Rochefort) – broken up after 1718
- Écueil 66 guns (designed by Bernard Renau d'Élissagaray, built by René Levasseur, launched March 1691 at Dunkirk) – deleted 1709
- Juste 64 guns (designed and begun by Étienne Salicon, completed by Philippe Cochois, launched 20 December 1691 at Le Havre) – broken up 1719
- Bizarre 68 guns (designed and built by Félix Arnaud, launched Autumn 1692 at Bayonne) – broken up 1727
- Bourbon 68 guns (Designed and built by François Coulomb snr, launched 17 November 1692 at Toulon) – captured by the Dutch in the Battle of Vigo Bay in October 1702 and burnt by them.
- Saint Louis class, designed by Joseph Andrault, built by Philippe Cochois and Pierre Chaillé.
  - Saint Louis 64, later 58 guns (launched 10 December 1692 at Le Havre) – took part in the Battle of Málaga, sold 1712
  - Éole 64, later 58 guns (launched 23 February 1693 at Le Havre) – took part in the Battle of Málaga, sold 1710
- Prompt 70, later 76 guns (Designed and built by René Levasseur, launched 25 December 1692 at Dunkirk) – captured by the English in the Battle of Vigo Bay in October 1702
- Fort 70 guns (Designed and built by Pierre Masson, launched February 1693 at Rochefort) – burnt in the Battle of Vigo Bay in October 1702
- Content 64, later 60 guns (Designed and built by François Coulomb snr, launched September 1695 at Toulon) – sold 1712
- Ferme 64, later 70 guns (Designed and built by Honoré Malet and Pierre Masson, launched 1700 at Rochefort) – captured by the English in the Battle of Vigo Bay in October 1702
- Parfait 72 guns (Designed and built by François Coulomb snr, launched 14 March 1701 at Toulon) – sold 1726
- Oriflamme class, designed and built by François Coulomb snr.
  - Toulouse 62 guns (launched 8 December 1703 at Toulon) – took part in the Battle of Málaga, reclassed as 3rd Rate 1707, captured by the British 1711
  - Oriflamme 62 guns (launched 15 January 1704 at Toulon) – took part in the Battle of Málaga, reclassed as 3rd Rate 1709, broken up 1727
- Neptune 72 guns (Designed and built by François Coulomb snr, launched 27 August 1704 at Toulon) – wrecked 1713
- Achille 64, later 62 guns (Designed and built by Blaise Pangalo, launched 23 February 1705 at Brest) – reclassed as Third Rank 1707, broken up 1744
- Saint Michel 70, later 74 guns (Designed and built by Alexandre Gobert, launched 1 February 1706 at Lorient) – broken up 1719
- Lis or Lys 72 guns (Designed and built by Blaise Pangalo, launched June 1706 at Brest) – broken up 1747
- Magnanime 72 guns (Designed and built by Étienne Hubac, launched 6 October 1706 at Brest) – wrecked 1712
- Pompeux 72 guns (Designed and built by Pierre Masson, launched August 1707 at Rochefort) – broken up 1719
- Conquérant 70 guns (Designed and built by François Chapelle, launched February 1712 at Toulon) – broken up 1743

=== Third Rank Ships ("vaisseaux de Troisième Rang") ===
From 1670, the Third Rank was defined as ships of the line carrying from 40 up to 50 carriage guns; in 1671 this was redefined as ships carrying from 48 to 60 guns. Initially during the first part of Louis XIV's reign these were designed and constructed as three-decked ships without forecastles and with minimal quarterdecks, although their upper decks were divided at the waist by an unarmed section of deck; but from about 1670 it was ruled that ships with fewer than 70 guns should not be built with three decks, so all subsequent Third Rank ships were two-decked vessels, i.e. carrying two complete gundecks, usually plus a few smaller carriage guns mounted on the gaillards (the quarterdeck and forecastle). During the first decade of the 18th century, the remaining Second Rank ships with 64 or fewer guns were down-graded (without change of armament) to Third Rank.

- Dragon 42 guns (designed and built by Laurent Hubac, launched 1646 at Brest) – reduced to 34 guns in 1669, hulked 1674 and sold in July 1684
- Mazarin 48, later 42 guns (designed and built by Laurent Hubac, launched early 1647 at Brest) – renamed Bon in June 1671; wrecked in December 1671
- Reine 56 guns (designed and built by Rodolphe Gédéon, launched 9 February 1647 at Toulon) – classed as 2nd Rank in 1669, then reduced to 50 guns in 1670 and reclassed as 3rd Rank in 1671; renamed Brave in June 1671 but hulked in 1673 and taken to pieces in 1674.
- Brézé 56 guns (designed and built by Rodolphe Gédéon, launched 9 October 1647 at Toulon) – wrecked 25 November 1665 at the mouth of the Charente.
- César 56 guns (designed and built by Laurent Hubac, launched 1648 at Brest) – renamed Rubis in June 1671 and taken to pieces in 1673.
- Hercule 42 guns (designed and built by George Carteret and Laurent Hubac, launched 1655 at Brest) – broken up 1673
- Saint Louis 56 guns (designed and built by Jean Laure, launched 3 July 1658 at Soubise) – classed as 2nd Rank in 1669, then reduced to 56 guns in 1670 and reclassed as 3rd Rank in 1671; renamed Aimable in June 1671; removed from service in 1688 and taken to pieces in 1690.
- Royale 56 guns (designed and built by Laurent Hubac, launched February 1661 at Brest) – reclassed as 3rd Rank in 1670, renamed Ferme in June 1671, condemned 1676
- Chalain or Grand Chalain 42/48 (seized 1661, built 1657 at Concarneau) – renamed Triomphe 1662, then Courageux in June 1671; condemned 1672 and broken up
- Rubis 60, later 64 guns (designed and built by Laurent Hubac, launched November 1664 at Brest) – captured by the English on 28 September 1666, becoming French Ruby in the English Navy; broken up 1685.
- Dauphin 56, later 54 guns (designed by Rodolphe Gédéon and built by François Pomet, launched March 1664 at Toulon) – renamed Vermandois 1671, then Vigilant 1678; condemned 1699 and broken up 1700
- Diamant 54, later 56 guns (designed and built by Laurent Hubac, launched December 1664 at Brest) – broken up 1685
- Thérèse 60 guns (designed and built by François Pomet, launched 13 March 1665 at Toulon) – blew up in action 24 July 1669
- Trident 44, later 54 guns (designed and built by Laurent Hubac, launched January 1666 at Brest) – renamed Aquilon in June 1671, hulked 1674 and sold in July 1684
- Breton 56 guns (designed and built by Laurent Hubac, launched 8 February 1666 at Brest) – renamed Courtisan in June 1671; wrecked 1 May 1674 off India
- Navarre 56 guns (designed and built by Jean-Pierre Brun, launched June 1666 at Tonnay-Charente) – renamed Constant in June 1671; wrecked June 1673 off India
- Comte 50, later 60 guns (designed and built by Jean Nissard, launched 15 January 1667 at Toulon and completed by Rodolphe Gédéon) – renamed Prudent in June 1671; hulked 1695
- Lys 60 guns (designed and begun by Laurent Hubac, launched in Spring of 1667 at Brest) – renamed Assuré in June 1671; sold 1689
- Fleuron 58, later 50 guns (designed and built by Laurent Hubac, launched early 1668 at Brest) – condemned 1668
- Rouen 52 guns (designed and built by Jean Esnault for the French East India Company, purchased from them in February 1668 and launched 8 February 1666 at Brest) – wrecked 11 September 1670 off Le Havre
- Rochefort 56 guns (designed and built by François Pomet, launched May 1669 at Rochefort) – renamed Sage in June 1671; wrecked off Ceuta on 19 April 1692.
- Wallon 48, later 50 guns (designed and built by Laurent Hubac, launched 30 August 1669 at Brest) – renamed Duc in June 1671; condemned 1691
- Brave 48, later 54 guns (probably designed and built by François Pomet, launched March 1670 at Rochefort) – renamed Prince in June 1671; wrecked in May 1678
- Bourbon class Designed and built by Laurent Hubac.
  - Louvre 50 (launched 29 April 1670 at Brest) – renamed Bourbon in June 1671; wrecked in May 1678
  - Oriflamme 50 (launched 1 November 1670 at Brest) – wrecked February 1691
- Alsace 56, later 60 guns (designed by Jean Laure and built by François Pomet, launched 4 October 1670 at Rochefort) – renamed Fier in June 1671; condemned 1695 and broken up before 1700.
- Navarrais 56 guns (designed and built by François Pomet, launched 22 November 1670 at Rochefort) – renamed Excellent in June 1671; deleted 1676 or 1677.
- Furieux 56, later 58 guns (designed and built by Rodolphe Gédéon, launched 15 April 1671 at Toulon) – renamed Brillant in June 1678; deleted 1687 and broken up 1688 or 1689.
- Vaillant class. Designed and built by Laurent Hubac.
  - Anjou 50, later 54 guns (launched 25 May 1671 at Brest) – renamed Vaillant on 24 June (30 days after launch); condemned 1690 and broken up 1691.
  - Ardent 54 guns (launched 25 May 1671 at Brest) – renamed Téméraire on 24 June (30 days after launch); captured by the English on 9 December 1694 off Kinsale and burnt.
- Émerillon 54, later 56 guns (designed by François Pomet, built by him and Jean Guichard, launched 20 June 1671 at Rochefort) – renamed Fortuné on 24 June 1671 (4 days after launch); condemned 1688.
- Fidèle class. Designed and built by Laurent Coulomb.
  - Glorieux 56, later 60 guns (launched 14 June 1671 at Toulon) – renamed Agréable on 24 June (10 days after launch); condemned 1715 and broken up 1717.
  - Fidèle 56 guns (launched 1 July 1671 at Toulon) – wrecked in November 1676 off Corsica.
- Intrépide 48, later 56 guns (designed by François Pomet, built by Honoré Malet, launched in July 1671 at Rochefort) – hulked 1686.
- Parfait 54, later 64 guns (designed and built by François Chapelle, launched 31 July 1671 at Toulon) – condemned 1699.
- Apollon 44, later 60 guns (designed and built by François Pomet, launched in August 1671 at Rochefort) – originally rated at 4th Rank, but raised to 3rd Rank in 1673 (although became 4th Rank again from 1687 to 1688); deleted 1709.
- Fougueux 54, later 60 guns (designed and built by Jean Guérouard, launched 15 August 1671 at Toulon) – grounded and lost in the Charente 1 April 1691.
- Précieux class. Designed and built by Barthélémy Tortel.
  - Heureux 48, later 54 guns (launched 3 October 1671 at Le Havre) – hulked 1690 and broken up after 1693.
  - Précieux 48, later 52 guns (launched 15 December 1671 at Le Havre) – captured by the Dutch 1677 but recovered; condemned 1678 and burnt.
- Bon 48, later 56 guns (designed by Laurent Hubac, built by Jean Hontabat and Joseph Saboulin, launched 25 May 1672 at Brest) – condemned 1692 and broken up.
- Maure class. Designed by Joseph Saboulin and built by Jean Hontabat.
  - Maure 48, later 58 guns (launched 29 August 1672 at Bayonne) – renamed Content in June 1678; hulked in 1694.
  - Fendant 48, later 58 guns (launched 29 August 1672 at Bayonne) – hulked in April 1694.
- Incertain 48, later 56 guns (designed and built by Hendryck Houwens, launched 22 September 1672 at Dunkirk) – renamed Brave in 1674; condemned 1681 and broken up.
- Saint Michel 56, later 64 guns (designed and built by Louis Audibert, launched in August 1673 at Marseille) – hulked 1685 and broken up in 1687.
- Hercule 52 guns (designed and built by Laurent Hubac, launched October 1673 at Brest) – wrecked on 11 May 1678 in the Caribbean.
- Écueil 50, later 60 guns (designed and built by Laurent Coulomb, launched 14 April 1678 at Toulon) – burnt by the English at Battle of La Hogue on 2 June 1692.
- Excellent 50, later 68 guns (designed and built by Honoré Malet, launched in 1679 at Rochefort) – condemned 1710 and sold to be broken up in same year.
- Précieux 50, later 58 guns (designed and built by Étienne Salicon, launched 5 October 1679 at Le Havre) – deleted 1694.
- Courageux 50, later 60 guns (designed and built by François Pomet, launched 18 December 1679 at Rochefort) – deleted 1705.
- Entreprenant 50, later 60 guns (designed and built by Jean-Pierre Brun, launched in March 1680 at Brest) – hulked 1720 and sold to be broken up in 1738.
- Prince 54, later 60 guns (designed and built by Jean-Pierre Brun, launched 1680 at Brest) – condemned 1717 and broken up.
- Arrogant class. Designed by Jacques Doley and built by Étienne Salicon.
  - Arrogant 50, later 60 guns (launched 6 May 1682 at Le Havre) – took part in the Battle of Málaga, captured by the English in the Battle of Marbella in March 1705.
  - Brave 50, later 60 guns (launched 7 June 1683 at Le Havre) – deleted 1697.
- Apollon 50, later 62 guns (designed by the Marquis de Langeron and built by Étienne Hubac and Blaise Pangalo, launched January 1683 at Brest) – deleted 1716.
- Vermandois 60, later 62 guns (designed and built by Étienne Hubac, launched 1 April 1684 at Brest) – hulked 1715 and broken up 1727.
- Marquis 56/60 (launched 4 March 1685 at Toulon) – took part in the Battle of Málaga, captured by the Dutch in the Battle of Marbella in March 1705
- Sans Pareil 60, later 58 guns (launched end 1685 at Le Havre) – deleted 1698.
- Modéré 60, later 52 guns (designed and built by Hendryck Houwens, launched 1685 at Dunkirk) – captured by the English in the Battle of Vigo Bay in October 1702
- Saint Michel 58, later 60 guns (designed and built by Étienne Salicon, launched 14 December 1686 at Le Havre) – grounded and lost 1 May 1704.
- Diamant 58, later 60 guns (designed and built by Hendryck Houwens, launched February 1687 at Dunkirk) – broken up 1724–25.
- François 52 guns (designed and built by Étienne Salicon, launched 20 December 1687 at Le Havre) – classed as 4th Rank with 40 guns in 1688, then raised to 52 guns in 1691 and reclassed as 3rd Rank; broken up 1736.
- Trident 50 guns (designed and built by Laurent Coulomb, launched 22 June 1688 at Toulon) – classed as 4th Rank with 44 guns in 1688, then raised to 54 guns in 1690 and reclassed as 3rd Rank; captured by the British in 1695, becoming HMS Trident.
- Maure 54 guns (designed and built by Blaise Pangalo, launched August 1688 at Toulon) – classed as 4th Rank with 44 guns in 1688, then raised to 54 guns in 1690 and reclassed as 3rd Rank; captured by the British in 1710, renamed HMS Moor.
- Fortuné class. Designed by Laurent Coulomb and built by him and his son François Coulomb.
  - Fortuné 56, later 60 guns (launched 16 July 1689 at Toulon) – Burnt August 1707.
  - Fleuron 56, later 60 guns (launched 21 July 1689 at Toulon) – broken up 1722.
- Assuré 60 guns (designed and built by Hendryk Houwens, launched December 1690 at Dunkirk) – wrecked at Ceuta 19 April 1692
- Perle 52 guns (designed and built by René Levasseur, launched December 1690 at Dunkirk) – Lost 1709
- Entendu 58 guns (designed and built by René Levasseur, launched February 1691 at Dunkirk) – deleted 1701
- Capable 58 guns (designed and built by René Levasseur, launched September 1692 at Dunkirk) – broken up 1706
- Phénix 60 guns (designed and built by François Coulomb, launched 7 October 1692 at Toulon) – broken up 1714
- Indien 52 guns (designed and built by Pierre Coulomb, launched 22 October 1692 at Lorient) – lost off Burma 1698
- Bon 56 guns (designed by Bernard Renau d'Élissagaray and built by Jean-Pierre Brun, launched 17 August 1693 at Brest) – deleted 1703
- Pélican class. Designed and built by Félix Arnaud.
  - Pélican 50 guns (launched early 1693 at Bayonne) – beached and abandoned 5 September 1697 following the Battle of Hudson's Bay.
  - Mignon 50 guns (launched Spring 1693 at Bayonne) – sold at Cartagena in 1709.
- Gaillard 54 guns (designed and built by Félix Arnaud, launched 13 October 1693 at Bayonne) – captured by the British in 1710
- Fougueux 50 guns (designed and built by Blaise Pangalo, launched 14 May 1695 at Brest) – captured by the English in 1696, sank 1696
- Téméraire 50, later 54 guns (designed and built by Étienne Hubac, launched June 1695 at Brest) – broken up 1723
- Trident 60, later 56 guns (designed and built by François Coulomb snr, launched August 1695 at Toulon) – broken up 1720
- Solide 50 guns (designed and built by Blaise Pangalo, launched 10 September 1695 at Brest) – burnt in the Battle of Vigo Bay in October 1702
- Mercure 50 guns (designed and built by Étienne Hubac, launched 7 December 1696 at Brest) – captured by the English in 1746
- Assuré class. Designed and built by François Coulomb.
  - Assuré 60 guns (launched 1697 at Toulon) – captured by the English in the Battle of Vigo Bay in October 1702 and added to the RN as HMS Assurance 70, BU 1712
  - Prudent 60 guns (launched 31 August 1697 at Toulon) – burnt in the Battle of Vigo Bay in October 1702
- Hasardeux 50 guns (designed and built by Pierre Coulomb, launched August 1699 at Lorient) – captured by the English in 1703 and added to the RN as HMS Hazardous.
- Oriflamme 64 guns (Designed and built by François Coulomb snr, launched 31 October 1699 at Toulon) – burnt in the Battle of Vigo Bay in October 1702
- Amphitrite 52 guns; later 46/48 (designed and built by René Levasseur, launched October 1700 at Dunkirk) – renamed Protée in March 1705; deleted 1722
- Fendant 58, later 56 guns (designed and built by Philippe Cochois, launched 18 October 1701 at Le Havre) – lost in Indian Ocean in March 1713.
- Sage 55, later 56 guns (designed and built by Pierre Coulomb, launched 28 November 1701 at Lorient) – deleted 1707 after being fired by British bombardment.
- Triton 52 guns (designed and built by Antoine Tassy, launched 1703 at Bayonne) – deleted 1720
- Rubis 56 guns (designed and built by Pierre Coulomb, launched 21 January 1704 at Lorient) – took part in the Battle of Málaga, broken up 1729
- Jason 54 guns (designed and built by Blaise Pangalo, launched 2 May 1704 at Brest) – deleted 1720
- Auguste 54 guns (designed and built by Étienne Hubac, launched 3 May 1704 at Brest) – captured by the English in August 1705 and added to the RN as HMS Auguste.
- Hercule 56, later 60 guns (designed and built by Desjumeaux, launched 22 June 1705 at Lorient) – broken up 1746
- Mars 54 guns (designed and built by René Levasseur, launched December 1705 at Lorient) – broken up 1720
- Dauphine 60 guns (designed and built by Philippe Cochois, launched 23 March 1706 at Le Havre) – broken up 1719
- Bourbon 54 guns (designed and built by Laurent Hélie and Alain Donard, launched 26 June 1706 at Lorient) – captured by Dutch privateers in March 1707 and renamed Gekronde Burg.
- Auguste 54 guns (designed and built by René Levasseur, launched 21 September 1707 at Dunkirk) – struck at Brest 1720
- Superbe 56 (designed and built by Pierre Coulomb, launched 12 December 1708 at Lorient) – Captured by the British in 1710 and added to the RN as HMS Superb 64, BU 1732

=== Fourth Rank Ships ("vaisseaux de Quatrième Rang") ===
From 1670, the French Quatrième Rang consisted of vessels with two complete batteries ("two-deckers") armed with from 30 to 40 guns. From 1671, this was redefined as vessels armed with from 36 to 46 guns, and those vessels with fewer than 36 guns were re-classed as Fifth Rank ships; in 1683 this was revised again to include only two-decked ships with from 40 to 46 guns. These ships were also described as frigates (frégates) of the 1st Order.

- Infante 36 (launched June 1661 at Brest) – renamed Ecueil in June 1671; wrecked 1673
- Jules 38 (launched July 1661 at Toulon) – renamed Indien in June 1671; wrecked 1673
- Beaufort class (2 ships)
  - Beaufort 36–38 (launched 15 May 1662 at Toulon) – renamed Neptune in June 1671, then Maure in January 1679; condemned 1686
  - Mercoeur 36 (launched July 1662 at Toulon) – renamed Trident in June 1671; condemned 1686
- Duc 42–46 (launched 1665 at Brest) – renamed Comte in June 1671; wrecked 1676
- Sirène 44–46 (launched June 1666 at Toulon) – wrecked 1684
- Cheval Marin 44–46 (launched June 1666 at Toulon) – broken up 1729
- Ecueil 40–44 (launched 2 November 1678 at Le Havre) – sold 1689
- Leger 40 (launched 3 November 1679 at Le Havre) – condemned 1695
- Solide 44 (launched 6 November 1683 at Dunkirk) – wrecked 1694
- Emporte 44 (launched 20 November 1683 at Dunkirk) – condemned 1705 and abandoned
- Gaillard 44–48 (launched 17 November 1684 at Le Havre) – sold 1689
- François 48–52 (launched 20 October 1687 at Le Havre) – broken up 1736
- Trident 50 (launched 22 June 1688 at Toulon) – captured by the English in 1695, added to the RN under the same name
- Alcyon 40 (launched July 1689 at Dunkirk) – broken up 1718
- Adroit 44 (launched 20 January 1691 at Le Havre) – sunk 1703
- Poli class (2 ships)
  - Opiniatre 40 (launched July 1691 at Rochefort) – deleted 1699
  - Poli 40 (later 36) (launched August 1691 at Rochefort) – broken up 1717
- Pélican 44 (launched 1693 at Bayonne) – sunk in 1697 in Hudson Bay
- Mutine 40 (launched 28 May 1695 at Brest) – deleted 1708
- Volontaire 44 (launched late August 1695 at Toulon) – reduced to 36 guns in 1701; captured and wrecked in the Battle of Vigo Bay in October 1702
- Amphitrite 42/44 (launched 1696 at Rochefort) – burnt by accident 1713
- Avenant 42 (launched September 1696 at Brest) – burnt by accident 1704
- Dauphine 40/42 (launched 9 January 1697 at Le Havre) – burnt in the Battle of Vigo Bay in October 1702
- Triton 44 (launched January 1697 at Brest) – captured by the English in the Battle of Vigo Bay in October 1702
- Thétis 44 (launched 1697 at Rochefort) – captured by the English 1705
- Renommée 44–48 (launched early 1698 at Bayonne) – deleted 1723
- Maurepas 46 (begun as Hazardeux but renamed June 1698; launched October 1698 at Lorient) – given to the Compagnie des Indes 1698, recovered 1703 but transferred again 1705
- Adélaïde 44 (launched 10 January 1699 at Toulon) – wrecked 1714
- Dryade 44–46 (launched 21 October 1702 at Le Havre) – captured by the British 1709
- Parfaite class (2 ships)
  - Parfaite 40 (launched 29 September 1704 at Toulon) – sunk 1718
  - Vestale 40 (launched 1705 at Toulon) – broken up 1739
- Griffon 44–50 (launched 10 January 1705 at Lorient) – captured by the British in 1712, but returned; broken up 1748
- Thetis 44–50 (launched 20 June 1705 at Brest) – captured by the British in 1707
- Atalante class (2 ships)
  - Atalante 40–44 (launched February 1707 at Le Havre) – condemned 1729–33
  - Diane 42–44 (launched February 1707 at Le Havre) – deleted 1711
- Amazone 40–42 (launched 16 April 1707 at Brest) – hulked 1741, broken up 1748
- Gloire 38 (launched 18 April 1707 at Lorient) – captured by the British in 1709, became HMS Sweepstakes; broken up 1716
- Argonaute 42–50 (launched 14 November 1708 at Brest) – hulked 1720, broken up 1746

=== Captured or otherwise acquired from foreign navies in the Louis XIV era ===
- ? (ex-Algerine, captured 1665, ex-Dutch Giardino d'Olanda (Hollandsche Tuyn) 40)
- Saint Cosme 50/52, 3rd Rang (ex-Spanish San Cosimo, captured 1672) – Broken up 1677
- Saint Pierre 50/52, 3rd Rang (ex-Spanish San Pedro, captured 1674) – Sold 1681
- Défenseur 54, 3rd Rang (ex-Dutch East India Company Beschermer, captured 10 December 1677) – Wrecked 11 May 1678 on Îles Aves
- Saint Louis 56/60, 3rd Rang (ex-Genoese San Giacomo, captured April 1684) – burnt by the British at La Hogue on 2 June 1692
- Vaillant 50, 3rd Rang (ex-English Mary Rose, captured 22 July 1691) – lost in December 1698 off Cyprus
- Heureux Retour 46, 3rd Rang (ex-English Happy Return, captured 14 November 1691) – recaptured in May 1708 by HMS Burford but not re-added to English Navy
- Jerzé 48, 3rd Rang (ex-English Jersey, captured 28 December 1691) – sold 1717
- ? 40 (ex-Dutch, captured 1691)
- ? 54 (ex-Dutch, captured by Maure and Modéré 1692)
- ? 48 (ex-Dutch, captured by Maure and Modéré 1692)
- ? 62 (ex-Spanish galleon, captured 1692)
- Zélande 64, 3rd Rang (ex-Dutch Zeelandia, captured 27 June 1693 off Lagos) – condemned and hulked in June 1708
- Ville de Médemblick 64, 3rd Rang (ex-Dutch Wapen van Medemblik, captured 27 June 1693 off Lagos) – struck 1712
- ? 50 (ex-English, captured 1694) (same as next?)
- Espérance d'Angleterre 70, 2nd Rang (ex-English Hope, captured 1695) – Recaptured and wrecked in the Battle of Vigo Bay in October 1702
- ? 44 (ex-Dutch, captured 1696) – Scuttled by fire to prevent recapture
- ? (ex-Spanish galleon, captured by des Augiers 1696)
- ? (ex-Spanish galleon, captured by des Augiers 1696)
- Rotterdam 40, 4th Rang (ex-Dutch Rotterdam, captured May 1703) – struck 1706
- Elizabeth 70, 2nd Rang (ex-English Elizabeth, captured 22 November 1704) – Deleted 1720
- Coventry 50, 4th Rang (ex-English Coventry, captured 4 August 1704) – Recaptured 17 May 1709
- Falmouth 50, 4th Rang (ex-English Falmouth, captured 15 August 1704) – sold for merchant use in January 1706
- Pendennis 54, 3rd Rang (ex-English Pendennis, captured 1705) – Sold 1706
- Blekoualle 54, 3rd Rang (ex-English Blackwall, captured 1705) – Recaptured 1708
- Mercure 40–42, 4th Rang (ex-Dutch Mercurius, captured 1705) – Captured by the English 1707
- Hardenbroeck 50 (ex-Dutch Hardenbroek, captured 2 October 1706) – to Russia 1712 as Esperans 44
- Grafton 70, 2nd Rang (ex-English Grafton, captured 13 May 1707) – Broken up 1744
- Hampton Court 70, 2nd Rang (ex-English Hampton Court, captured 13 May 1707) – Sold 1712 to Spain as Nuestra Señora de Carmen, lost 1715.
- Cumberland 84, 2nd Rang (ex-British Cumberland, captured 21 October 1707) – To Spain (at Genoa) May 1715, renamed Principe de Asturias, captured by Britain at the Battle of Cape Passaro, 22 August 1718, sold to Austria 1720, renamed San Carlos, BU 1733
- Grand Vainqueur 54 (c. 1706, ex-Dutch Overwinnaer, captured 1708) – To Britain, to Russia 1712 as Viktoria
- Gloucester 60/64 (ex-British Gloucester, captured 1709) – To Genoa 1711, to Spain 1720, renamed Conquistador 62/64, stricken 1738
- Pembroke 60, 3rd Rang (ex-British Pembroke, captured 1710) – Retaken but foundered 1711
- Le Beau Parterre (c. 1710, ex-Dutch Schonauwen, captured 1711) – Intended for Russia but captured on delivery voyage by Sweden 1713/14, renamed Kronskepp

== Louis XV (1715 to 1774) ==
(Great-grandson of Louis XIV) As Louis XV was only 5 1/2 years old when he succeeded to the French throne, the first eight years of this reign were under the Regency of Philippe of Orléans, Duke of Chartres, the nephew of Louis XIV. While the five Rangs theoretically remained in existence, the construction by 1715 had crystallised around a number of distinct types, based on the number of carriage guns which they each carried.

=== First Rank ships ("vaisseaux de Premier Rang") in the Louis XV era ===
==== Three-decker type ====
Only four three-decker ships were completed during this reign of nearly sixty years; a fifth was destroyed before completion.

- Foudroyant 110 (launched April 1724 at Brest) – condemned 1742 and taken to pieces 1742–43.
- Royal Louis 118 (built from 1740 at Brest but never launched – burnt by arson while still on the stocks there on 25 December 1742).
- Royal Louis 116 (launched May 1759 at Brest) – condemned September 1772 and taken to pieces 1773.
- Ville de Paris 90 (launched 19 January 1764 at Rochefort) – laid down as Impétueux in 1757, renamed January 1762. Enlarged to 104 guns in 1778-70, captured by the British at the Battle of the Saintes in April 1782, sank in a storm on 19 September 1782.
- Bretagne 100 (later 110) guns. Designed by Antoine Groignard. (launched 24 May 1766 at Brest) – renamed Révolutionnaire in October 1793, condemned and taken to pieces in 1796.
First Rank ships of the Louis XV era
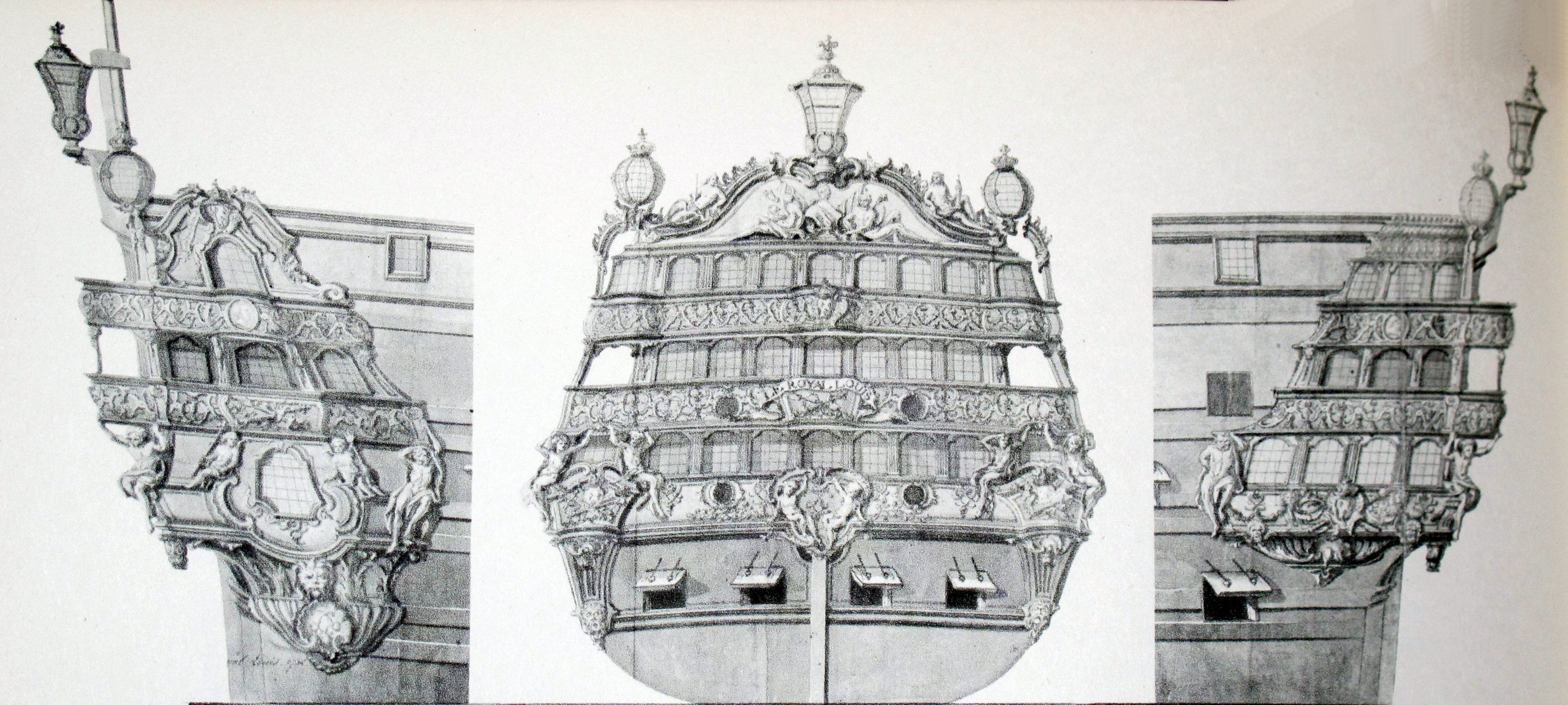
Decorations intended for Royal Louis (1743)

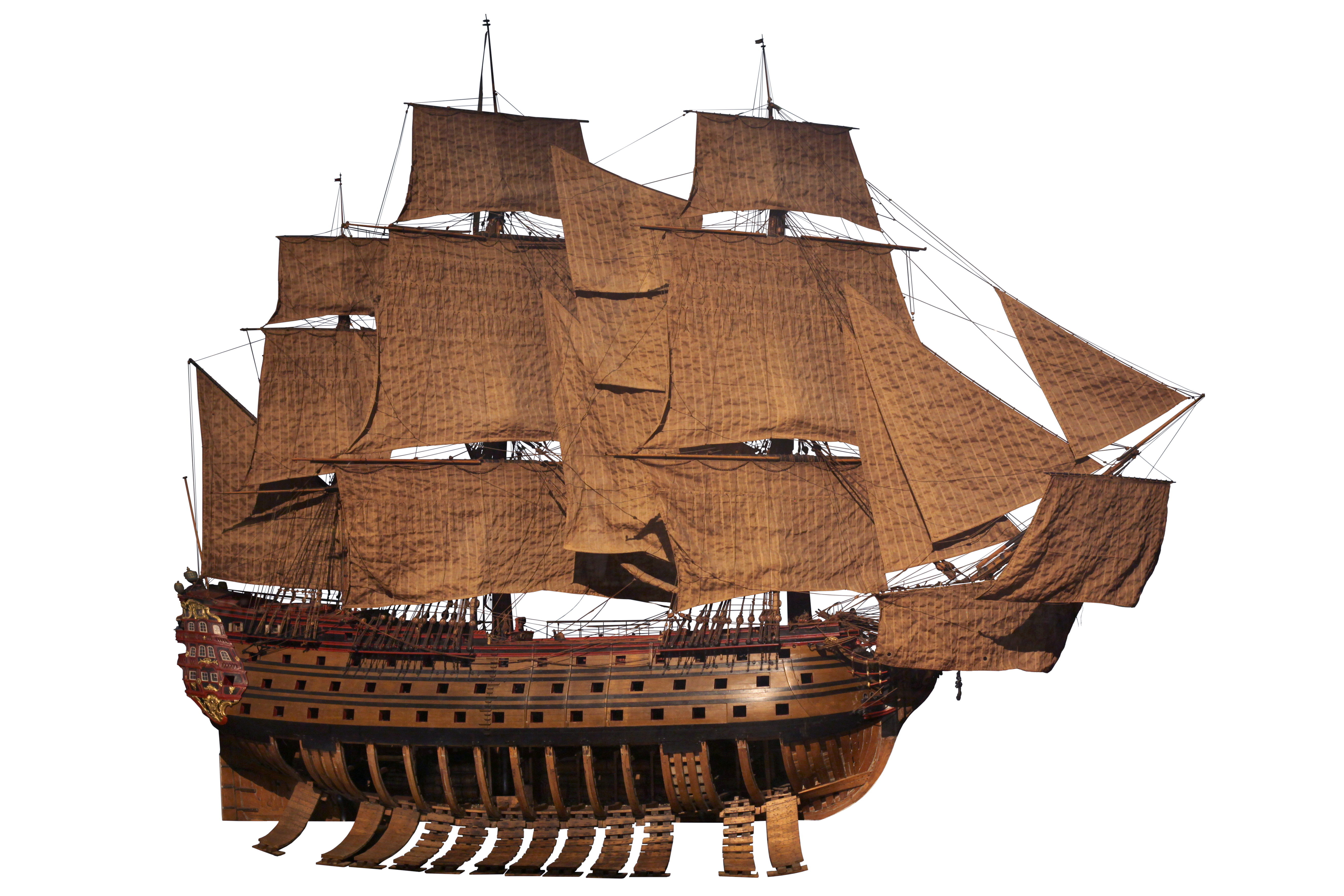
Model of the fictitious ship Sans Pareil that defined the type of Royal Louis (1758)

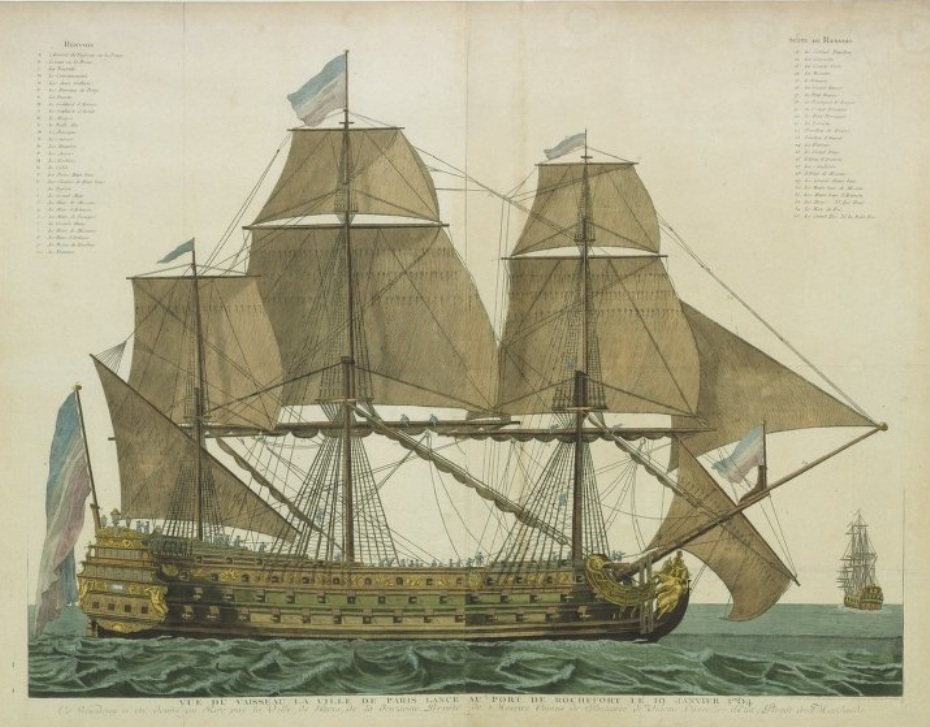
Ville de Paris in Rochefort, 1764

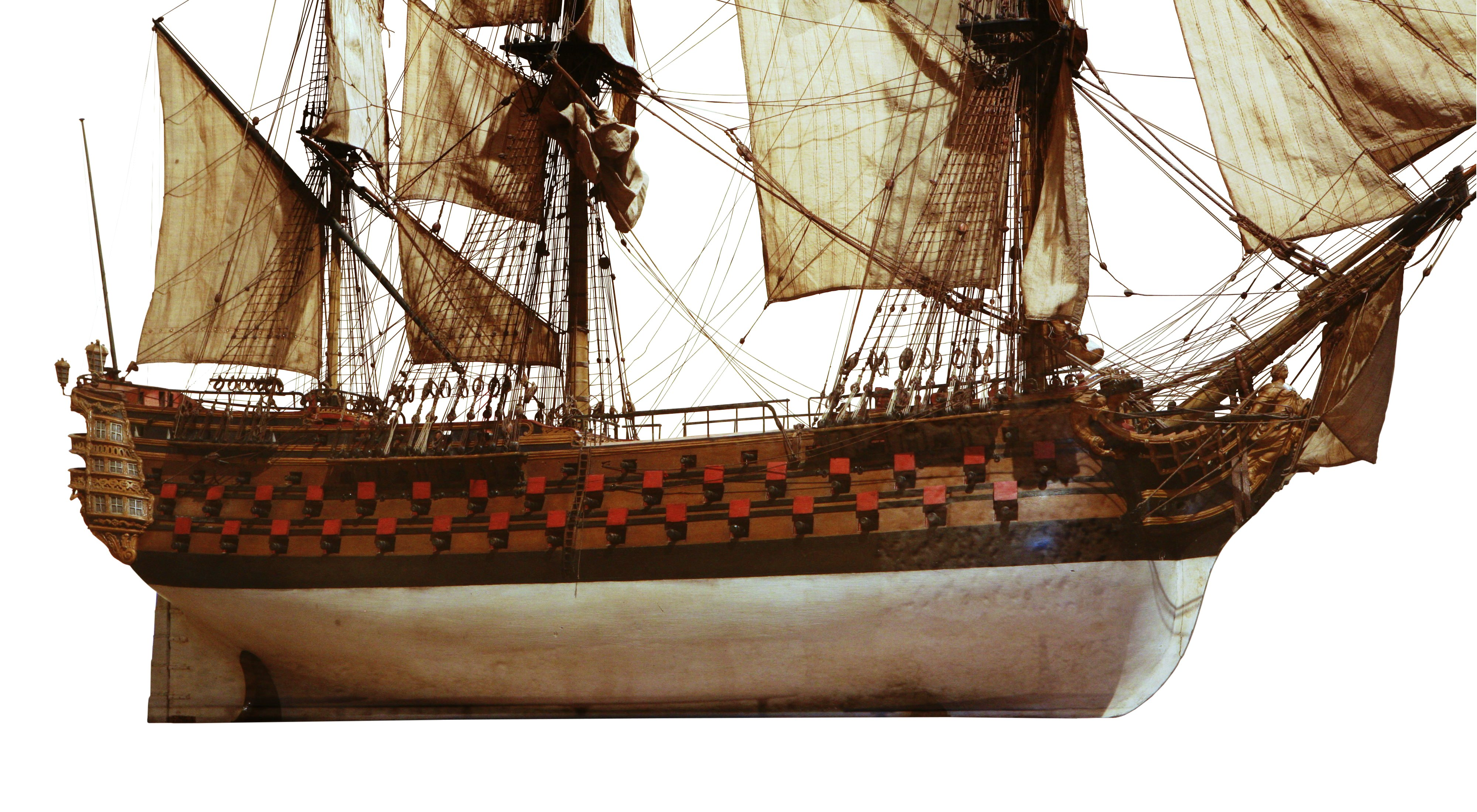
Scale model of Bretagne, on display at Brest naval museum

==== Two-decker type: 80-gun ships ("vaisseaux de 80") ====
Large two-deckers, with a weight of broadside equal to the three-deckers of Louis XIV's period, served usually as fleet flagships.

- Tonnant 80 (launched 17 November 1743 at Toulon, design by François Coulomb the Younger) – BU 1780
- Soleil Royal 80 (launched 30 June 1749 at Brest, design by Jaques-Luc Coulomb) – Driven ashore by the British and burnt at the Battle of Quiberon Bay in November 1759
- Foudroyant 80 (launched 18 December 1750 at Toulon, designed by François Coulomb the Younger) – Captured by the British near Cartagena in February 1758 and added to the RN under the same name, BU 1787
- Formidable 80 (launched June 1751 at Brest, designed by Jaques-Luc Coulomb) – Captured by the British in the Battle of Quiberon Bay in November 1759 and added to the RN under the same name, BU 1768
- Duc de Bourgogne 80 (launched 20 October 1751 at Rochefort, designed by François-Guillaume Clarain Deslauriers) – renamed Peuple in September 1792, then Caton in February 1794; BU 1800–1801
- Océan 80 (launched 20 June 1756 at Toulon, designed by François Coulomb the Younger) – Driven ashore and burnt by the British in the Battle of Lagos in August 1759
- Orient 80 (launched 9 October 1756 at Lorient, designed by Antoine Groignard) – Built for the Compagnie des Indes, bought by the French Navy in May 1759, wrecked in the East Indies 1782
- Saint-Esprit 80 (launched 12 October 1765 at Brest, designed by Joseph-Louis Ollivier) – renamed Scipion 1794; wrecked in a storm 1795
- Languedoc 80 (launched 14 May 1766 at Toulon, designed by Joseph Coulomb) – Captured by the British at Toulon in August 1793, retaken by the French in December 1793. Renamed Anti-fédéraliste in April 1794, then renamed Victoire in May 1795, BU 1799
- Couronne 80 (launched May 1768 at Brest, designed by Antoine Groignard) – Accidentally burnt in April 1781 (later refloated and rebuilt – see below)

=== 74-gun ships ("vaisseaux de 74") of the Louis XV era ===
These formed overwhelmingly the core of the French battlefleet throughout the 18th century. Initially these carried just 26 guns – all 36-pounders – in their first (lower deck) battery and 28 guns in their second (upper deck) battery, with 16 guns on the gaillards (quarterdeck and forecastle) – the total of 74 guns being achieved by having 4 small guns (4-pounders) on the 'dunette' (poop); this applied to twelve of the first thirteen vessels listed below. The exception in this group was the 70-gun Aimable, which – while having the same number of ports (except for the poop, where the 4-pounder guns on other ships were never included) – had only 24-pounders in its first (lower deck) battery. The 4-pounders were removed from the poop of all active units of this type by about 1750, reducing each to a 70-gun ship.

- Sceptre 74 (launched July 1720 at Brest, designed by Étienne Hubac) – taken to pieces in 1745.
- Bourbon 74 (launched September 1720 at Brest, designed by Laurent Helie) – foundered on 12 April 1741.
- Saint Philippe 74 (launched 1722 at Rochefort, designed by Pierre Masson, finished by Blaise Ollivier) – condemned 1745 and taken to pieces in 1746.
- Duc d'Orléans class. Four ships built at Toulon to a design by René Levasseur, 1719.
  - Duc d'Orléans 74 (launched 13 August 1722 at Toulon) – hulked 1748 and taken to pieces in 1766.
  - Phénix 74 (launched 17 March 1723 at Toulon) – taken to pieces in 1751.
  - Espérance 74 (launched 8 August 1724 at Toulon) – captured and burnt by the British 11 November 1755.
  - Ferme 74 (launched 11 November 1723 at Toulon) – converted to careening hulk 1755.
- Neptune 74 (launched November 1723 at Brest, designed by Laurent Helie) – captured by the British in the Second Battle of Cape Finisterre in October 1747
- Juste 74 (launched September 1725 at Rochefort, designed by Julien Geslain the Older) – wrecked following the Battle of Quiberon Bay on 20 November 1759.
- Saint Esprit 74 (launched 9 January 1726 at Toulon, designed by Blaise Coulomb) – hulked 1749 and taken to pieces in 1761.
- Aimable 70 (launched August 1725 at Brest, designed by Laurent Hélie) – condemned 1735 and taken to pieces in 1736.
- Superbe 74 (launched 27 June 1738 at Brest, designed by Jean-Marie Helie the Younger) – foundered following the Battle of Quiberon Bay on 20 November 1759.
- Dauphin-Royal 74 (launched 13 October 1738 at Brest, designed by Blaise Ollivier) – condemned 1783 and hulked; taken to pieces in 1787.

From the Terrible (of 1739) onwards, the lengthened hulls of new ships meant that they could mount an extra pair of guns on the lower deck and another extra pair on the upper deck; the 4 small guns on the dunette were henceforth abolished. The consequent armament of 28 guns (36-pounders) in their lower deck battery and 30 guns (18-pounders) in their upper deck battery, with 16 guns on the gaillards, thus became the standard for the next 75 years.

- Terrible 74 (launched 19 December 1739 at Toulon, designed by François Ollivier the Younger) – captured by the British in the Second Battle of Cape Finisterre in October 1747 and added to the RN under the same name, BU in 1763
- Invincible 74 (launched 21 October 1744 at Rochefort, designed by Pierre Morineau) – captured by the British in the First Battle of Cape Finisterre in May 1747 and added to the RN under the same name, wrecked in February 1758
- Magnanime 74 (launched 22 November 1744 at Rochefort, designed by Blaise Geslain) – captured by the British in January 1748 and added to the RN under the same name, BU 1775
- Conquérant 74 (launched 10 March 1746 at Brest, design by François Coulomb the Younger) – Out of service −3-1764 for rebuilding (new ship launched 1765)
- Monarque class. Three ships built at Brest to a design by Blaise Ollivier, 1745. Following his death in October 1746, the three ships were completed by Luc Coulomb.
  - Monarque 74 (launched March 1747 at Brest) – captured by the British in the Second Battle of Cape Finisterre in October 1747
  - Intrépide 74 (launched 24 March 1747 at Brest) – burnt by accident in July 1781
  - Sceptre 74 (launched 21 June 1747 at Brest) – hulked at Brest in January 1779
- Magnifique class. Three ships built to a design by Jacques-Luc Coulomb.
  - Magnifique 74 (launched 7 March 1749 at Brest) - wrecked in Boston Harbour on 10 August 1782.
  - Entreprenant 74 (launched 19 October 1751 at Brest) – burnt by the British in the siege of Louisbourg in July 1758
  - Guerrier 74 (launched 7 September 1753 at Toulon, designed by Jacques-Luc Coulomb, finished by Joseph Marie Blaise Coulomb) – Captured by the British at Toulon in August 1793, retaken there by the French in December 1793, captured and burnt by the British in the Battle of the Nile in August 1798.
- Téméraire 74 (launched 24 December 1749 at Toulon, design by Pierre-Blaise Coulomb and François Coulomb the Younger) – captured by the British in the Battle of Lagos in August 1759 and added to the RN as HMS Temeraire, sold 1784
- Couronne 74 (launched 1749 at Rochefort, designed by Blaise Geslain) – condemned 1766 and taken to pieces.
- Florissant class. Two ships built at Rochefort to a design by Pierre Morineau, 1748.
  - Florissant 74 (launched 11 August 1750 at Rochefort) – condemned 1762 at Cadiz.
  - Prudent 74 (launched 28 July 1753 at Rochefort) – burnt by the British in the siege of Louisbourg in July 1758
- Redoutable 74 (launched 5 May 1752 at Toulon, design by François Coulomb the Younger) – driven ashore and burnt by the British in the Battle of Lagos in August 1759.
- Palmier class. Two ships built at Brest to a design by Joseph Véronique-Charles Chapelle, 1750.
  - Palmier 74 (launched 21 July 1752 at Brest) – rebuilt at Brest 1766 to the lines of the Citoyen
  - Héros 74 (launched 1 September 1752 at Brest) – wrecked in combat with the British in the Battle of Quiberon Bay in November 1759
- Courageux 74 (launched 11 October 1753 at Brest, designed by Jean Geoffroy) – captured by the British in August 1761 and added to the RN under the same name, wrecked 1796
- Défenseur 74 (launched 6 March 1754 at Brest, designed by Pierre Salinoc)
- Hector 74 (launched 23 July 1755 at Toulon, designed by Pierre-Blaise Coulomb, finished by Joseph Marie Blaise Coulomb) – captured by the British in the Battle of the Saintes in April 1782, recaptured by the French in September 1782
- Diadème 74 (launched 26 June 1756 at Brest, designed by Jacques-Luc Coulomb) – renamed Brutus in September 1792, BU 1797
- Glorieux 74 (launched 10 August 1756 at Rochefort, designed by François-Guillaume Clairin-Deslauriers) – captured by the British in the Battle of the Saintes in April 1782, sank in a storm in September 1782
- Zodiaque 74 (launched 19 November 1756 at Brest, designed by Jacques-Luc Coulomb) – Condemned in November 1783, sold 1784
- Centaure 74 (launched 17 March 1757 at Toulon, designed by Joseph Marie Blaise Coulomb) – captured by the British in the Battle of Lagos in August 1759 and added to the RN as HMS Centaur, wrecked off Newfoundland in 1782
- Minotaure 74 (launched April 1757 at Brest, designed by Jacques-Luc Coulomb, converted to floating battery in Saint-Domingue in July 1781, hulked from 1785 and stricken, 1784 withdrawn from service, and broken up in June 1787)
- Souverain class – designed by Noël Pomet.
  - Souverain 74 (launched 6 June 1757 at Toulon) – captured by the British at Toulon in August 1793, retaken there by the French in December 1793, renamed Peuple-Souverain c. 1794, captured by the British in the Battle of the Nile in August 1798 and added to the RN as HMS Guerrier, BU 1810.
  - Protecteur 74 (launched 21 May 1760 at Toulon) – hulked as hospital ship at Rochefort 1784.
- Robuste 74 (launched 2 September 1758 at Lorient, designed by Antoine Groignard) – condemned in 1783 and taken to pieces in 1784.
- Thésée 74 (launched 28 January 1759 at Brest, designed by Pierre Salinoc) – capsized and foundered at Battle of Quiberon Bay on 20 November 1759.
- Couronne Ottomane 74 (launched September 1760 at Constantinople (Istanbul) for the Ottoman Navy, and purchased August 1761 for France) – returned to the Ottomans in January 1762
- Diligent class – designed by Antoine Groignard
  - Diligent 74 (launched November 1762 at Lorient-Caudan) – condemned and taken to pieces in 1779.
  - Six Corps 74 (launched 29 December 1762 at Lorient-Caudan) – condemned and taken to pieces in 1779.
- Zélé 74 (launched 1 July 1763 at Toulon) – designed by Joseph-Marie-Blaise Coulomb, hulked 1805, renamed Réserve then taken to pieces 1806.
- Citoyen class Four ships designed by Joseph-Louis Ollivier (three of them rebuilt from earlier 74s)
  - Citoyen 74 (launched 27 August 1764 at Brest) – Broken up 1792
  - Conquérant 74 (launched 29 November 1765 at Brest, designed by Joseph-Louis Ollivier) – Built with timbers from the 1746 ship of the same name, captured by the British at Toulon in August 1793, retaken there by the French in December 1793, captured by the British in the Battle of the Nile in August 1798 and added to the RN under the same name
  - Palmier 74 (launched December 1766 at Brest) – Built with timbers from the 1746 ship of the same name, foundered in April 1782 off Bermuda
  - Actif 74 (launched 5 October 1767 at Brest) – Condemned 1783.
- Bourgogne 74 (launched 26 June 1766 at Toulon, designed by Noël Pomet)
- Marseillais 74 (launched 16 July 1766 at Toulon, designed by Joseph Chapelle) – renamed Vengeur du Peuple in February 1794, sunk by the British in the Glorious First of June 1794
- César class – designed by Joseph-Marie-Blaise Coulomb (a modification from the Zélé design)
  - César 74 (launched 3 August 1768 at Toulon) – captured by the British and burnt at the Battle of the Saintes in April 1782.
  - Destin 74 (launched 21 October 1777 at Toulon) – captured by the British at Toulon in August 1793 and burnt by them there in December 1793.
- Bien-Aimé class – designed by Antoine Groignard
  - Bien-Aimé 74 (launched 22 March 1769 at Lorient)
  - Victoire 74 (launched 4 October 1770 at Lorient)
- Fendant 74, designed by Antoine Groignard (begun February 1772, launched 11 November 1776 at Rochefort) – condemned and broken up 1785 at Mauritius.

Note that the Destin and Fendant are included here as they were begun under Louis XV's reign, although neither was launched until after 1774.

=== 64-gun ships ("vaisseaux de 64") of the Louis XV era ===
The 60 or 62 (later 64-gun) gun ship built from 1717 onwards continued the practice of similarly-armed vessels built in the first decade of the century. They were two-deckers with a "first tier" (or lower deck) battery of twenty-four 24-pounder guns and a "second tier" (upper deck) battery of twenty-six 12-pounder guns, supplemented by between ten and fourteen 6-pounder guns mounted on the gaillards (forecastle and quarterdeck).

- Éclatant 62, later 64 guns (launched 1 April 1721 at Brest, designed and built by Julien Geslain) – hulked 1745 and taken to pieces 1764.
- Solide 62, later 64 guns (launched 14 November 1722 at Toulon, designed and built by René Levasseur) – hulked 1750 and taken to pieces 1771.
- Saint Louis class 64. Class of two ships designed by Pierre Masson in 1720 and completed after his death by Joseph Ollivier and Julien Geslain respectively.
  - Saint Louis 64 (launched January 1723 at Rochefort) – condemned 1745 and hulked; taken to pieces 1748.
  - Ardent 64 (launched 1723 at Rochefort) – driven ashore and wrecked by the British in Quiberon Bay in October 1746.
- Élisabeth 64 (launched November 1722 at Brest, designed and built by Laurent Hélie) – hulked 1748 and burnt by accident 1756.
- Léopard 64 (launched 29 November 1727 at Toulon, designed and built by Blaise Coulomb) – condemned and burnt 1757.
- Triton 60 (launched 11 April 1728 at Brest, designed and built by Laurent Hélie) – condemned 1745 and taken to pieces.
- Fleuron 64 (launched 29 April 1730 at Brest, designed by Blaise Olliviere and built by Joseph Ollivier) – burnt at Brest 1745
- Éole 64 (launched 30 December 1733 at Toulon, designed and built by Blaise Coulomb) – wrecked 1745.
- Borée 64 (launched 22 December 1734 at Toulon, designed and built by François Coulomb the Younger) – wrecked 1746

The Borée, longer than previous 64s, had managed to fit in a thirteenth pair of 24-pounder guns on the lower deck. Subsequent 64s managed to fit in a fourteenth pair of 12-pounder guns on the upper deck as well, with the number of 6-pounder guns on the quarterdeck reduced to six (and still with four 6-pounders on the forecastle).

- Sérieux 64 (26 October 1740 at Toulon, designed and begun by René, completed by Pierre-Blaise Coulomb) – captured by the British in the First Battle of Cape Finisterre in May 1747
- Mars class. Designed and built by Blaise Ollivier.
  - Mars 64 (launched May 1740 at Brest) – captured by the British off Ireland in October 1746 and added to the RN under the same name, wrecked at Halifax 1755
  - Alcide 64 (launched 6 December 1743 at Brest) – captured by the British off North America in June 1755 and added to the RN under the same name, sold 1772
- Saint Michel class. Designed by Jean-Marie Hélie.
  - Saint Michel 64 (launched January 1741 at Brest) – condemned 1786.
  - Vigilant 64 (launched 11 May 1744 at Brest) – captured by the British near Louisbourg on 19 May 1745, added to the RN as HMS Vigilant, sold 1759
- Trident 64 (launched 13 September 1742 at Toulon, designed and built by Pierre-Blaise Coulomb) – captured by the British in the Second Battle of Cape Finisterre in October 1747
- Lys class. Designed and built by Jacques-Luc Coulomb.
  - Lys 64 (launched 10 September 1746 at Brest) – captured by the British off North America in June 1755
  - Fougueux 64 (launched March 1747 at Brest) – Captured by the British at the Second Battle of Cape Finisterre in October 1747
  - Dragon 64 (launched 16 September 1747 at Brest) – wrecked 1762.
- Content class. Designed by Joseph Véronique-Charles Chapelle, built by him, and François Chapelle respectively.
  - Content 64 (launched 11 February 1747 at Toulon) – condemned January 1770 and hulked, burnt by the British 1793.
  - Orphée 64 (launched 10 May 1749 at Toulon) – captured by the British in February 1758
- Triton 64 (launched 4 August 1747 at Toulon, design by François Coulomb the Younger) – hulked 1786 and taken to pieces in 1794.
- Achille 64 (launched 15 November 1747 at Toulon) – captured by the British in July 1761
- Saint Laurent 64 (launched 13 June 1748 at Quebec, designed and built by René-Nicolas Levasseur – taken to pieces in 1753–54. A sistership (Orignal) was launched on 2 September 1750 but broke apart on launching.
- Protée class. Designed and built by Francois-Guillaume Clairain-Deslauriers.
  - Protée 64 (launched 1 December 1748 at Brest) – condemned 1770 and taken to pieces in 1771.
  - Hercule 64 (launched 15 February 1749 at Brest) – hulked 1756 and sold 1761.
- Hardi class. Designed and built by Pierre Morineau.
  - Hardi 64 (launched 1750 at Rochefort) – captured by the British at Toulon in August 1793, retaken there by the French in December 1793.
  - Inflexible 64 (launched 1752 at Rochefort) – damaged at Battle of Quiberon Bay 20 November 1759. taken to pieces 1763.
- Illustre class. Designed and built by Pierre Salinoc.
  - Illustre 64 (launched 1750 at Brest) – taken to pieces in 1761.
  - Actif 64 (launched 15 December 1752 at Brest) – taken to pieces in 1767.
- Opiniâtre 64 (launched August 1750 at Brest) – wrecked in 1758.
- Lion class. Designed and built by Pierre-Blaise Coulomb.
  - Lion 64 (launched 22 May 1751 at Toulon) – hulked 1783 and sold 1785.
  - Sage 64 (launched 29 December 1751 at Toulon) – condemned 1767 and taken to pieces in 1768.
- Bizarre 64 (launched September 1751 at Brest, designed and built by Jacques-Luc Coulomb) – taken to pieces in 1772.
- Capricieux 64 (launched 13 September 1753 at Rochefort, designed and built by François-Guillaume Clairain-Deslauriers) – burnt by the British in the siege of Louisbourg in July 1758
- Bienfaisant 64 (launched 13 October 1754 at Brest, designed and built by Mathurin-Louis Geoffroy) – captured by the British in the siege of Louisbourg in July 1758 and added to the RN under the same name, BU 1814
- Sphinx class, designed and built by Pierre Salinoc.
  - Sphinx 64 (launched 20 August 1755 at Brest) – rebuilt by Joseph-Louis Ollivier and relaunched 9 December 1776 at Brest; hulked at Rochefort in May 1793 as a floating battery and disarmed in January 1802.
  - Belliqueux 64 (launched August 1756 at Brest) – captured by the British near Ilfracombe in November 1758
- Vaillant class. Designed and built by Noël Pomet.
  - Vaillant 64 (launched 1 October 1755 at Toulon) – hulked 1783.
  - Modeste 64 (launched 12 February 1759 at Toulon) – captured by the British in the Battle of Lagos in August 1759 and added to the RN under the same name, BU 1800
- Raisonnable 64 (launched November 1756 at Rochefort) – captured by the British in May 1758 and added to the RN under the same name, sank off Martinique 1762
- Célèbre 64 (launched February 1757 at Brest) – burnt by the British in the siege of Louisbourg in July 1758
- Brillant 64 (launched September 1757 at Lorient-Caudan, designed and built by Jacques-Luc Coulomb) – taken to pieces in 1771.
- Fantasque class. Designed and built by Pierre-Blaise Coulomb; modified from Lion class design.
  - Fantasque 64 (launched 10 May 1758 at Toulon) – hulked 1784.
  - Altier 64 (launched 23 May 1760 at Toulon) – condemned 1770 and sold 1772 for commerce.
- Solitaire 64 (launched 30 November 1758 at Lorient, designed and built by Antoine Groignard) – taken to pieces in 1771.
- Sainte Anne class. Four ships built for Genoa in 1756–59 by Ange-Marie Rati, and purchased by France in 1760.
  - Sainte Anne 64 – captured by the British in 1761 and added to the RN as HMS St Anne, sold in October 1784.
  - Notre Dame du Rosaire 64 – renamed Hazard on 24 June 1762. Hulked 1771.
  - Vierge de Santé 64 – renamed Rencontre on 24 June 1762. Condemned 1769 and taken to pieces.
  - Saint François de Paule 64 – renamed Aventurier on 16 April 1764. Condemned 1770 and sold 1772.
- Provence 64 (launched 29 April 1763 at Toulon) – taken to pieces 1786.
- Union 64 (launched November 1763 at Brest) – became hospital ship 1778, wrecked February 1782.
- Vengeur 64 (launched 25 October 1756 at Lorient for the Compagnie des Indies, and purchased by the Navy in July 1765) – sold for commerce in 1784 and wrecked 1785.
- Artésien class of five ships to design by Joseph-Louis Ollivier.
  - Artésien 64 (launched 7 March 1765 at Brest)
  - Roland 64 (launched 14 February 1771 at Brest)
  - Alexandre 64 (launched 28 February 1771 at Brest) – captured 1782
  - Protée 64 (launched 10 November 1772 at Brest) – captured by the British in February 1780 and added to the RN as HMS Prothee, BU 1815
  - Éveillé 64 (launched 10 December 1772 at Brest)

Three French East India Company ships were purchased by the Navy in April 1770; all designed and built by Antoine Groignard and Gilles Cambry.

- Actionnaire 64 (launched 22 December 1767 at Lorient for the Compagnie des Indes, purchased in April 1770 by the Navy) – captured by the British in the Bay of Biscay in April 1782
- Indien class
- Indien 64 (launched 30 July 1768 at Lorient for the Compagnie des Indes, purchased in April 1770 by the Navy) – condemned 1783 and sold 1784.
- Mars 64 (launched 17 August 1769 at Lorient for the Compagnie des Indes, purchased in April 1770 by the Navy) – burnt by accident in 1773.

Four further ships were begun before 1774, but were launched in Louis XIV's reign (see section below)

- Brillant 64 (launched September 1774 at Brest)
- Solitaire 64 (launched 22 October 1774 at Brest)
- Réfléchi 64 (launched 25 November 1776 at Rochefort) – renamed Turot in 1793
- Caton 64 (launched 5 July 1777 at Toulon)

=== Two-deckers of 56 guns with 36-pounder main battery ===
- Bordelois class: group of four ships designed by Antoine Groignard for operation in the shallow waters off Dunkirk, and built at Bordeaux by Léon-Michel Guignace.
  - Bordelois 56 guns (launched 26 April 1763 at Bordeaux) – Razeed to frigate 1768; converted into an indiaman 1776; deleted 1778; reactivated 1780 as États d'Artois; taken by Britain 1780 and renamed HMS Artois
  - Ferme 56 guns (launched 10 October 1763 at Bordeaux) – Deleted 1774
  - Utile 56 guns (launched 14 August 1764 at Bordeaux) – Deleted 1771
  - Flamand 56 guns (launched 11 May 1764 at Bordeaux) – Deleted 1785

=== Two-deckers of 50–60 guns (mainly "vaisseaux de 50") with 18-pounder or 24-pounder main battery ===
- Content 56, later 60 guns (launched March 1717 at Lorient, designed and built by Pierre Coulomb) – sold in 1747 and hulked in 1749.
- Jason 50, later 52 guns (launched 1 April 1724 at Le Havre, designed and built by Jacques Poirier) – Captured by the British in the First Battle of Cape Finisterre in May 1747 and added to the RN under the same name, sold 1793.
- Tigre 50 guns (launched 19 October 1724 at Toulon, designed and built by Blaise Coulomb) – taken to pieces in 1754 at Quebec.
- Brillant 56, later 58 guns (launched October 1724 at Brest, designed and built by Laurent Hélie) – taken to pieces 1754 at Quebec
- Alcyon 50 guns (launched 14 March 1726 at Toulon, designed and built by René Levasseur) – Burnt in action with the British in 1759.
- Rubis 50, later 54 guns (launched 18 November 1728 at Le Havre, designed and built by Jacques Poirier) – Captured by the British in the First Battle of Cape Finisterre in May 1747 and added to the RN as HMS Rubis.
- Heureux 60 guns (launched May 1730 at Toulon – La Ponché Rimade, designed by Pierre Sterein for commerce but purchased for the Navy while building) – hulked 1755 and condemned 1768.
- Diamant 50 guns (launched 4 September 1733 at Toulon, design by François Coulomb the Younger) – Captured by the British in the First Battle of Cape Finisterre in May 1747 and added to the RN as HMS Isis
- Apollon 56 guns (launched 1740 at Rochefort, designed and built by Pierre Morineau) – burnt and scuttled at Louisbourg in 1758
- Auguste 52 guns (launched January 1741 at Brest, designed and built by Jean Geoffroy) – Captured by the British in 1746 and added to the RN as HMS Portland's Prize
- Atalante 52 guns (launched 16 March 1741 at Toulon, designed and built by Joseph Véronique-Charles Chapelle) – burnt in action with the British in 1760.
- Caribou 52 guns (launched 13 May 1744 at Quebec, designed and built by René-Nicolas Levasseur – condemned 1757
- Oriflamme 56, later 50 guns (launched 30 October 1744 at Toulon, designed and built by Pierre-Blaise Coulomb) – Captured by the British in 1761, but not added to British Navy.
- Arc en Ciel 56, later 50 guns (launched 1745 at Bayonne, designed and built by Pierre Morineau) – Captured by the British near Louisbourg in 1756
- Fier 60, later 50 guns (launched 1 December 1745 at Toulon, designed and built by Joseph Véronique-Charles Chapelle) – sold for commerce 1782.
- Hippopotame 50 guns (launched 5 July 1749 at Toulon, designed and built by François Coulomb) – sold and renamed Fier Rodrigue in November 1777; requisitioned back into Navy 1779; condemned 1782 and taken to pieces 1784.
- Amphion 50–58 guns (launched 28 July 1749 at Brest) – Deleted 1787
- Aigle 50 guns (launched 1750 at Rochefort, designed and built by Pierre Morineau) – converted to a flûte in 1758, wrecked 1765.
- Sagittaire 50 guns (launched 8 August 1761 at Toulon, designed and built by Jean-Marie-Blaise Coulomb) – sold for commerce around 1790.
- Dauphin 50–56 (c. 1770?) – Ex-Indiaman. Sold 1773

=== Small two-deckers of 42 – 48 guns ("vaisseaux de 40 à 48") of the Louis XV era ===
- Argonaute class of two ships to design by Laurent Hélie.
  - Argonaute 46 guns (launched July 1722 at Brest) – hulked 1741.
  - Parfaite 46 guns (launched January 1723 at Brest) – burned accidentally 1746.
- Néréide 42 guns (launched 26 March 1724 at Rochefort, designed and built by Blaisee Ollivier) – condemned and taken to pieces in 1743.
- Gloire 46 guns (launched May 1725 at Le Havre) – captured by the British in the First Battle of Cape Finisterre in May 1747 and added to the RN as HMS Glory
- Aquilon 42, later 48 guns (launched 24 November 1733 at Toulon, designed and built by Jean-Armand Levasseur) – wrecked 14 May 1757.
- Aurore 46 guns (launched 3 April 1745 at Rochefort, designed and built by Pierre Morineau) – hulked in October 1748 and deleted 1753.
- Étoile 46 guns (launched April 1745 at Le Havre, designed and built by Pierre Chaillé) – burnt 1747 to avoid capture by the British
- Junon 44 guns (launched 2 December 1747 at Le Havre, designed and built by Pierre Chaillé) – hulked and sold in 1757.

=== Captured or otherwise acquired from foreign navies in the Louis XV era ===
- Poder 60–62 (ex-Spanish Poder, sold by Spanish Navy for merchant service 1740 and captured February 1744) – burnt February 1744
- Severn 40–48 (ex-British Severn of 48 guns, captured 1746) – recaptured by the British in the Second Battle of Cape Finisterre in October 1747
- Warwick 60–62 (ex-British Warwick, captured March 1756) – recaptured by the British in January 1761
- Greenwich 50–58 (ex-British Greenwich, captured March 1757) – wrecked January 1758
- ? 70/80 (ex-Maltese San Salvadore, obtained 1760/61, ex-Turkish Corona Ottomana, mutinied and handed over 1760) – Returned to Turkey 1761

== Louis XVI (1774 to 1792) ==
=== First Rates ("vaisseaux de Premier Rang") of the Louis XVI era ===
110-gun three-decker group of 1780. Three different constructeurs designed these ships; the first two were by François-Guillaume Clairain-Deslauriers and Léon-Michel Guignace respectively, while the Toulon pair were by Joseph-Marie-Blaise Coulomb. Typically each carried 30 × 36-pdr guns on the lower deck, 32 × 24-pdr guns on the middle deck, 32 × 12-pdr guns on the upper deck, and 16 × 8-pdr guns on the gaillards, although this armament varied from time to time.

- Invincible 110 (begun February 1779, launched 20 March 1780 and completed May 1780 at Rochefort) – condemned in 1806 and broken up in 1808.
- Royal-Louis 110 (begun March 1779, launched 20 March 1780 and completed June 1780 at Brest) – renamed Républicain in September 1792, wrecked in storm December 1794.
- Terrible 110 (begun July 1779, launched 27 January 1780 and completed May 1780 at Toulon) – condemned in 1804 and broken up.
- Majestueux 110 (begun July 1780, launched 17 November 1780 and completed February 1781 at Toulon) – renamed Républicain in May 1797, condemned in 1808.
First Rates of the Louis XVI era
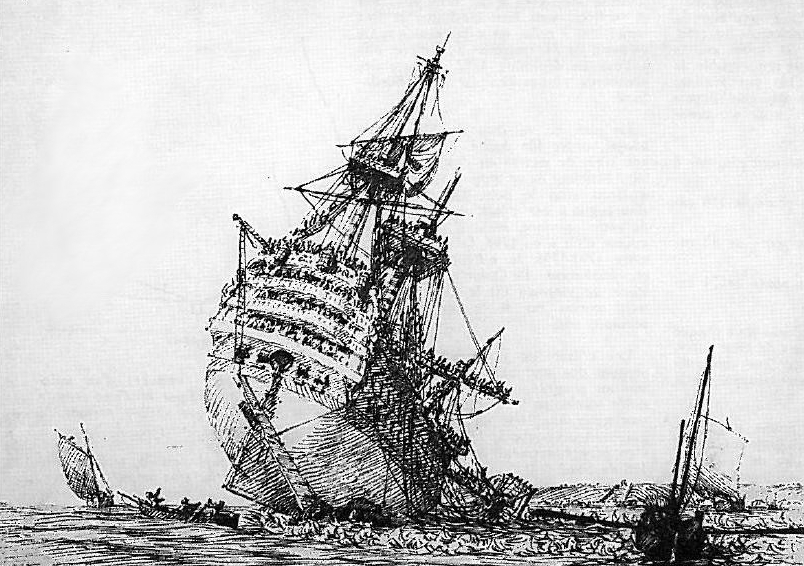
Royal-Louis as Républicain grounded on Mingant rock. Drawing by Pierre Ozanne.

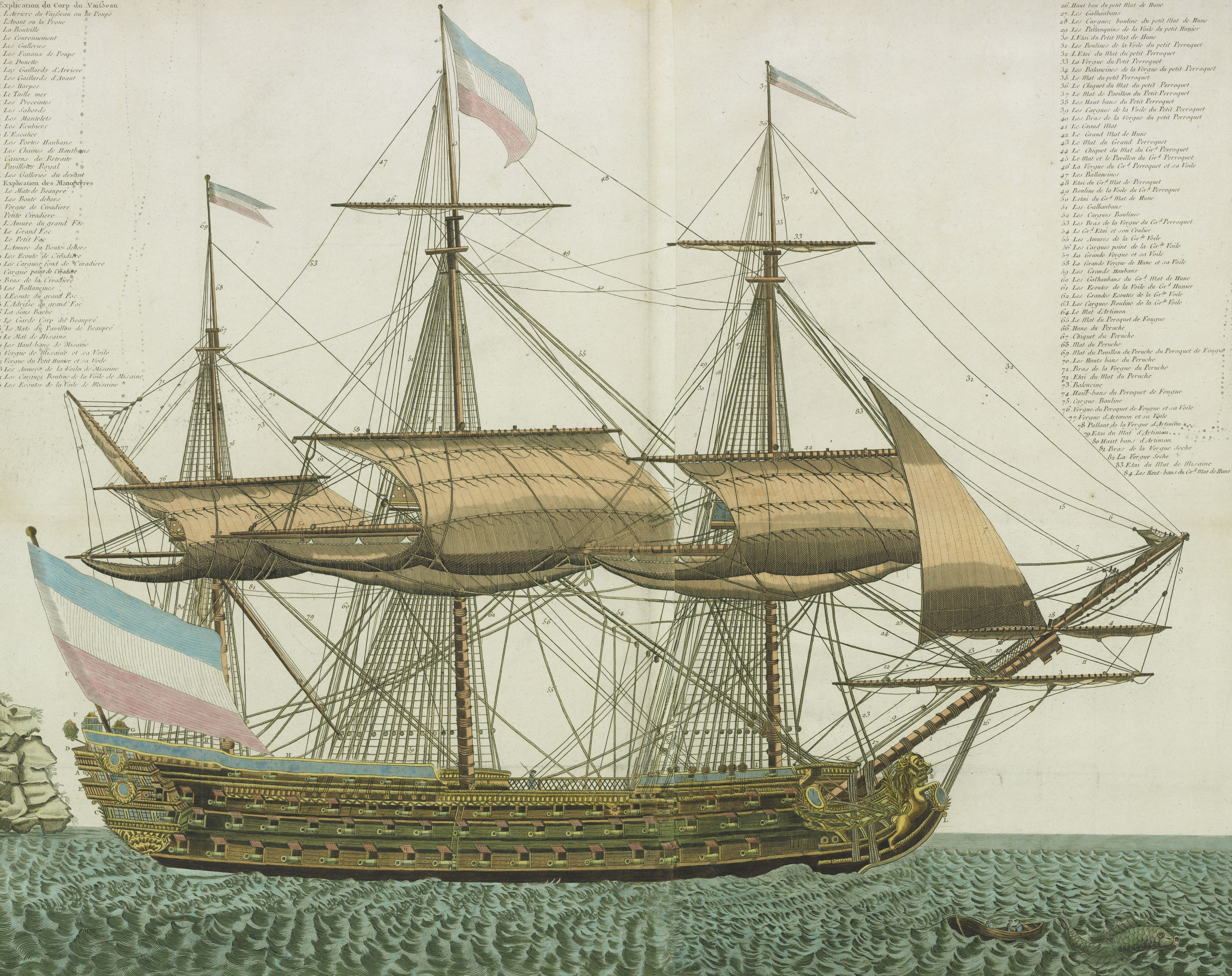
18th-century engraving of Terrible

Océan class (sometimes called "États de Bourgogne class" or "Dauphin Royal class") – Three-deckers of 118 guns (usually called 120-gun), designed by Jacques-Noël Sané. Each carried 32 × 36-pdr guns on the lower deck, 34 × 24-pdr guns on the middle deck, 34 × 12-pdr guns on the upper deck, and 18 × 8-pdr guns on the gaillards.

- Commerce de Marseille 118 (begun April 1787, launched 7 August 1788 and completed October 1790 at Toulon) – captured by the British at Toulon in August 1793 and added to the RN under the same name, BU 1802
- États de Bourgogne 118 (begun August 1786, launched 8 November 1790 and completed December 1790 at Brest) – renamed Cote d'Or 1793, renamed Montagne 1793, renamed Peuple 1795, renamed Océan 1795, BU 1856
- Dauphin-Royal 118 (begun May 1790, launched 20 July 1791 and completed August 1793 at Toulon) – renamed Sans Culotte 1792 – captured by the British at Toulon in August 1793, retaken there by the French in December 1793, renamed Orient 1795, blown up by the British in the Battle of the Nile in August 1798
Océan-class ships of the Louis XVI era
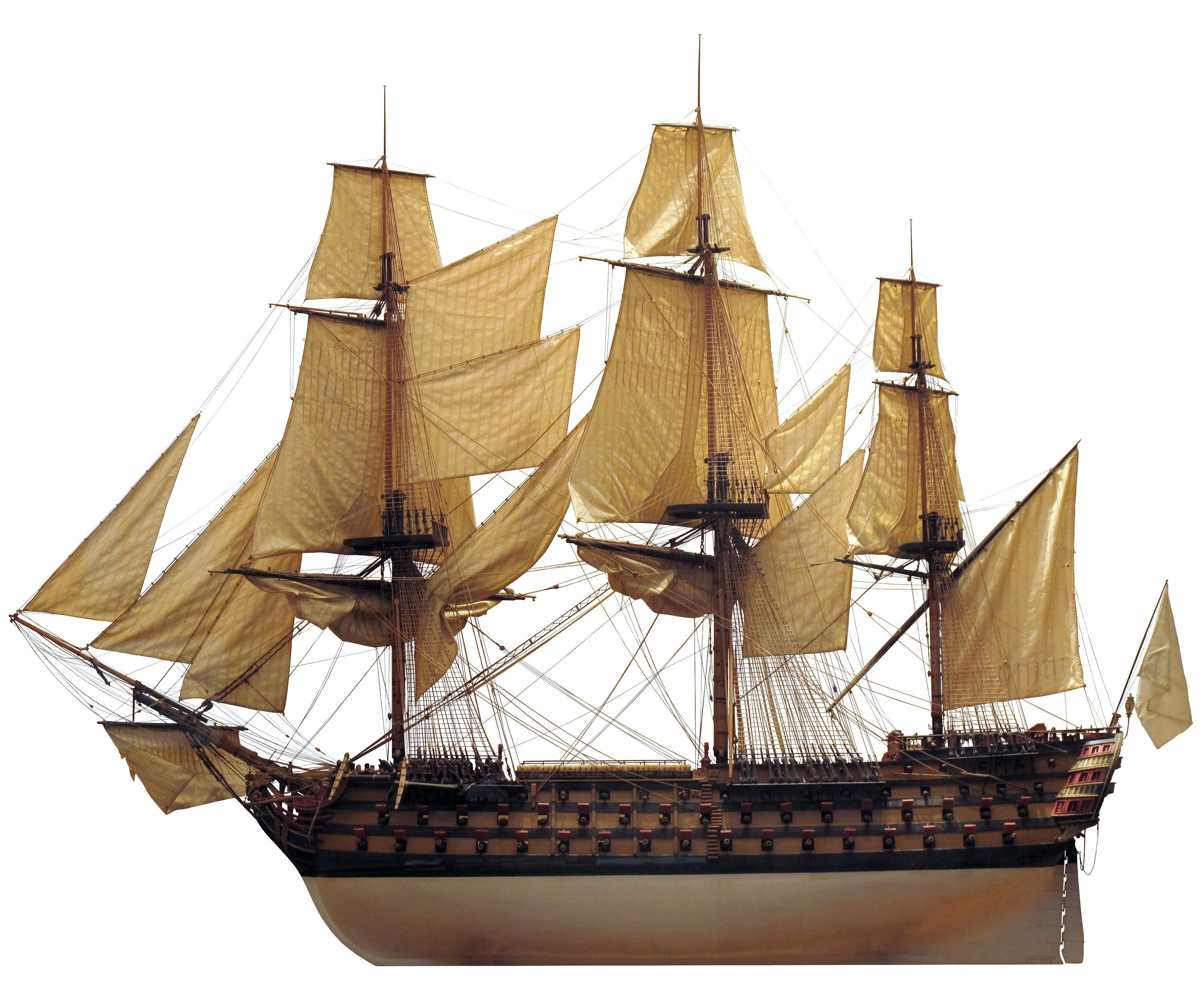
Model of Commerce de Marseille

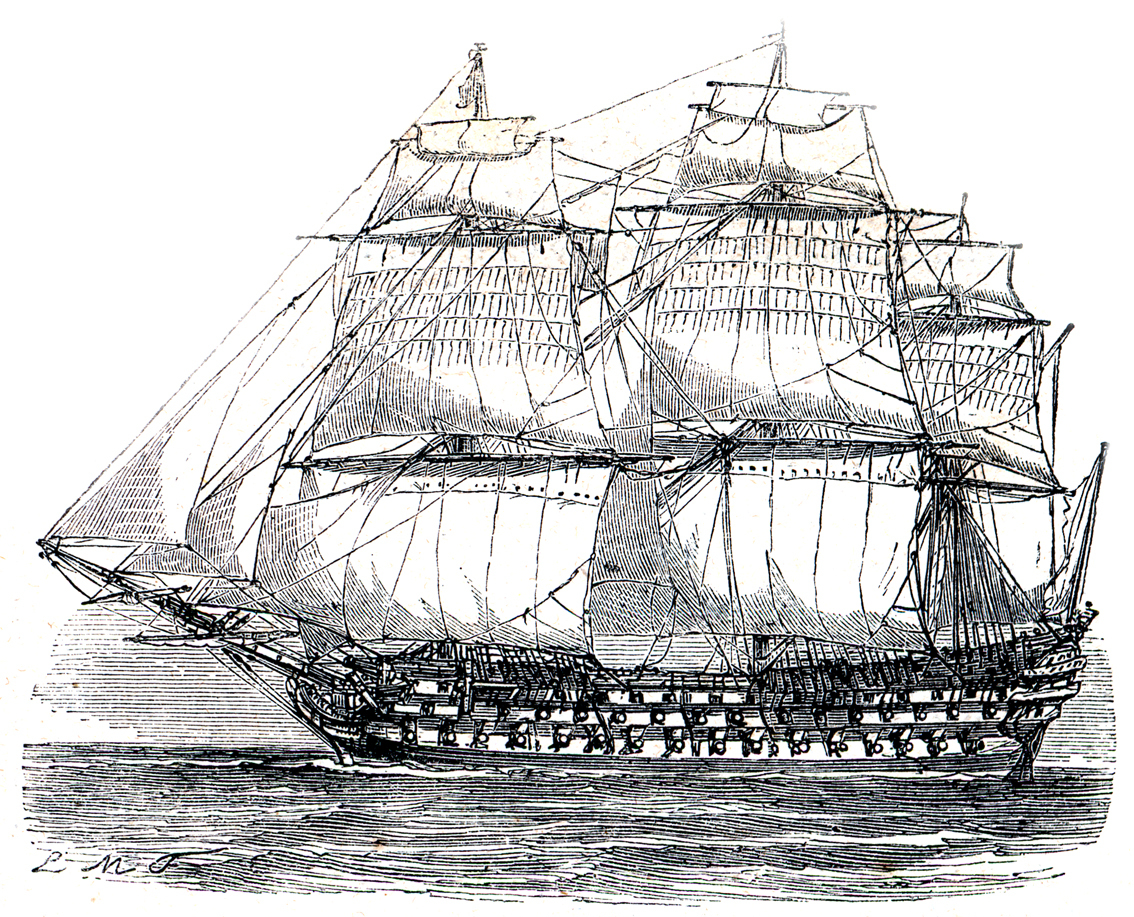
Illustration of Océan by Antoine Léon Morel-Fatio

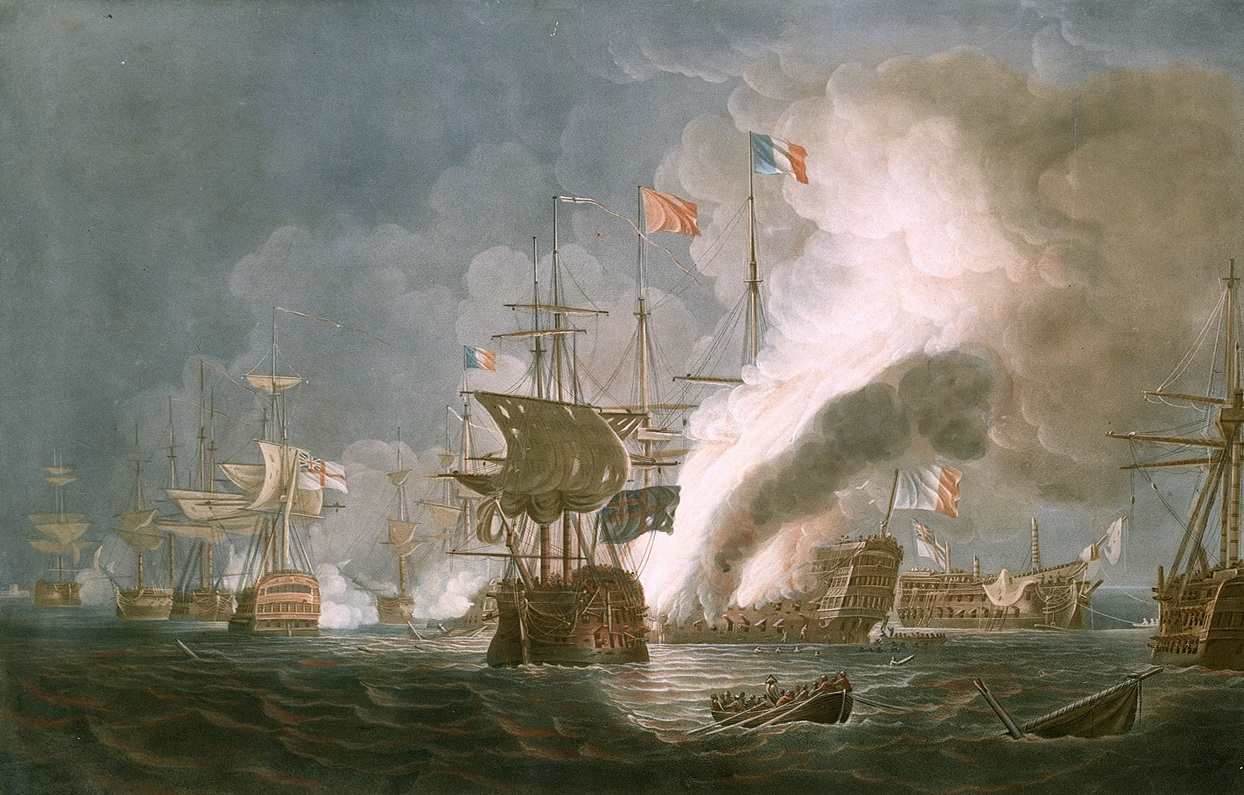
Orient (centre) on fire at the Battle of the Nile

=== 80-gun ships ("vaisseaux de 80") of the Louis XVI era ===
- Auguste 80 (designed by Léon-Michel Guignace, launched 18 September 1778 at Brest) – Renamed Jacobin in March 1793, then renamed Neuf Thermidor in December 1794, sank in storm off Brest on 9 January 1795
- Triomphant 80 (designed by Joseph-Marie Blaise Coulomb, launched 31 March 1779 at Toulon) – Captured by the British at Toulon in August 1793 and burnt by them there on 18 December 1793
- Couronne 80 (a rebuilding of the ship of 1766, re-launched 18 September 1781 at Brest) – renamed Ca Ira in September 1792, captured by the British on 14 March 1795 and burnt by them by accident in April 1796
- Deux Frères 80 (designed by Antoine Groignard, launched mid September 1784 at Brest) – Renamed Juste on 29 September 1792, captured by the British in the Glorious First of June 1794 and added to the RN under the same name, broken up 1811

Tonnant class (1787 onwards) – Following his standard design for 74-gun ships (see Téméraire class below), Jacques-Noël Sané then produced a standard design (approved on 29 September 1787) for an 80-gun ship, to which 8 ships were eventually built.

- Tonnant 80 (launched 24 October 1789 at Toulon) – Captured by the British at Toulon in August 1793, retaken there by the French in December 1793, captured by the British in the Battle of the Nile on 2 August 1798 and added to the RN under the same name, broken up 1821
- Indomptable 80 (launched 20 December 1790 at Brest) – Wrecked in the storm following the Battle of Trafalgar on 22 October 1805 off Rota
- Sans Pareil 80 (launched 8 June 1793 at Brest) – Captured by the British in the Glorious First of June 1794 and added to the RN under the same name, broken up October 1842

=== 74-gun ships ("vaisseaux de 74") of the Louis XVI era ===
Two ships which were begun before 1774 were completed later; see 'Fendant (1776) and Destin (1777) under 1715–1774 section above.

- Neptune 74-gun ship designed by Pierre-Augustin Lamothe (launched 20 August 1778 at Brest) – Wrecked in a storm 1794

Scipion class (1778 onwards) – Designed by Francois-Guillaume Clairin-Deslauriers

- Scipion 74 (launched 19 September 1778 at Rochefort) – wrecked off San Domingo in October 1782
- Hercule 74 (launched 5 October 1778 at Rochefort) – Razéed to 50-gun frigate in June 1794
- Pluton 74 (launched 5 November 1778 at Rochefort) – BU 1805

Annibal class (1778 onwards) – Designed by Jacques-Noël Sané

- Annibal 74 (1778) – Renamed Achille 1786, captured by the British in the Glorious First of June 1794 and added to the RN under the same name, BU 1796
- Northumberland 74 (1779) – Captured by the British in the Glorious First of June 1794 and added to the RN under the same name, BU 1795
- Héros 74 – designed by Joseph-Marie-Blaise Coulomb (launched 30 December 1778 at Toulon) – captured by the British at Toulon in August 1793 and burnt by them there in December 1793

Magnanime class (1779 onwards) – Designed by Jean-Denis Chevillard

- Magnanime 74 (launched 27 August 1779 at Rochefort) – deleted 1792 and broken up 1793
- Illustre 74 (launched 23 February 1781 at Rochefort) – cut down (razéed) to 52-gun ship 1794 and renamed Scévola, wrecked in a storm in December 1796
- Sceptre 74 – designed by Pierre-Augustin Lamothe (launched 9 September 1780 at Brest) – BU 1811

Argonaute class (1781) – Designed by François-Guillaume Clairin-Deslauriers.

- Argonaute 74 (launched 5 June 1781 at Rochefort) – cut down (razéed) to a 42-gun ship 1794 and renamed Flibustier, out of service 1795
- Brave 74 (launched 6 June 1781 at Rochefort) – hulked in 1798, not mentioned after 1803

Pégase class (1781 onwards) – Designed by Antoine Groignard.

- Pégase 74 (launched 15 October 1781 at Brest) – Captured by the British in the Bay of Biscay in April 1782 and added to the RN under the same name, BU 1815
- Dictateur 74 (launched 16 February 1782 at Toulon) – Renamed Liberté in September 1792, captured by the British at Toulon in August 1793 and burnt by them there in December 1793, repaired by the French but BU 1807
- Suffisant 74 (launched 6 March 1782 at Toulon) – Captured by the British at Toulon in August 1793 and burnt by them there in December 1793
- Puissant 74 (launched 13 March 1782 at Lorient) – Captured by the British at Toulon in August 1793 and added to the RN under the same name, sold in 1816
- Alcide 74 (launched 27 May 1782 at Rochefort) – Captured by the British at Toulon in August 1793, retaken there by the French in December 1793, blown up by the British in the Battle of Hyeres in July 1795
- Censeur 74 (launched 24 August 1782 at Rochefort) – Captured by the British at Toulon in August 1793, retaken there by the French in December 1793, captured by the British in the Battle of Cape Noli in March 1795, retaken by the French in October 1795, and transferred to Spain in June 1799, BU 1799

Centaure class (1782 onwards) – Designed by Joseph-Marie-Blaise Coulomb, all built at Toulon.

- Centaure 74 (launched 7 November 1782 at Toulon) – Captured by the British at Toulon in August 1793, retaken there by the French in December 1793
- Heureux 74 (launched 19 December 1782 at Toulon) – Captured by the British at Toulon in August 1793, retaken there by the French in December 1793, burnt by the British in the Battle of the Nile in August 1798
- Séduisant 74 (launched 5 July 1783 at Toulon) – Renamed Pelletier in September 1793, then Séduisant again in May 1795, wrecked in December 1796
- Mercure 74 (launched 5 August 1783 at Toulon) – Captured by the British at Toulon in August 1793, retaken there by the French in December 1793, burnt by the British in the Battle of the Nile in August 1798

Téméraire class (1782 onwards) – numerically the largest class of battleships ever built to a single design. Designed by Jacques-Noël Sané, 97 vessels, each of 74 guns, were laid down between 1782 and 1813. The first 31 of these, launched before the execution of Louis XVI:-

- Téméraire 74 (launched 17 December 1782 at Brest) – BU at Brest 1803
- Audacieux 74 (launched 28 October 1784 at Lorient) – BU at Brest 1803
- Superbe 74 (launched 11 November 1784 at Brest) – Lost in a storm in January 1795
- Généreux 74 (launched 21 July 1785 at Rochefort) – Captured by the British at Toulon in August 1793, retaken there by the French in December 1793, captured by the British near Lampedusa in February 1800 and added to the RN under the same name, BU 1816
- Commerce de Bordeaux 74 (launched 15 September 1785 at Toulon) – Renamed Bonnet Rouge in January 1794, then Timoléon in February 1794, burnt by the British in the Battle of the Nile in August 1798
- Ferme 74 (launched 16 September 1785 at Brest) – Renamed Phocion in October 1792, transferred to Spain 1793, renamed Le Ferme again, stricken 1808 at La Guaira
- Fougueux 74 (launched 19 September 1785 at Lorient) – Captured by the British in the Battle of Trafalgar in October 1805 and wrecked in the subsequent storm.
- Patriote 74 (launched 3 October 1785 at Brest) – BU 1833
- Commerce de Marseille 74 (launched 7 October 1785 at Toulon) – Renamed Lys in July 1786 (before completion), then Tricolore in October 1792, captured by the British at Toulon in August 1793 and burnt by them there in December 1793
- Borée 74 (launched 17 November 1785 at Lorient) – Renamed Ça Ira in April 1794, then Agricola in June 1794, BU 1803.
- Orion 74 (launched 18 April 1787 at Rochefort) – Renamed Mucius Scaevola in November 1793, then shortened to Mucius in the same month
- Léopard 74 (launched 22 June 1787 at Brest)
- Entreprenant 74 (launched 11 October 1787 at Lorient)- Captured by the British at Toulon in August 1793, retaken there by the French in December 1793
- Impétueux 74 (launched 25 October 1787 at Rochefort) – Captured by the British in the Glorious First of June 1794 and added to the RN under the same name, accidentally burnt 1794
- Apollon 74 (launched 21 May 1788 at Rochefort) – Renamed Gasparin in February 1794, then Apollon again in May 1795, and finally Marceau in December 1797, BU 1798
- América 74 (launched 21 May 1788 at Brest) – Captured by the British in the Glorious First of June 1794, renamed Impetueux on 14 July 1795, BU 1813
- Duquesne 74 (launched 2 September 1788 at Toulon) – Captured by the British near Saint Domingue in July 1803 and added to the RN under the same name, BU 1805
- Duguay-Trouin 74 (launched 30 October 1788 at Brest) – Captured by the British at Toulon in August 1793 and burnt by them there in December 1793
- Tourville 74 (launched 16 December 1788 at Lorient) – BU 1841
- Aquilon 74 (launched 8 June 1789 at Rochefort) – Captured by the British in the Battle of the Nile in August 1798 and added to the RN as HMS Aboukir, BU 1802
- Jupiter 74 (launched 4 November 1789 at Brest) – Renamed Démocrate in March 1794, then Jupiter again in May 1795, and finally Batave in December 1797, BU 1807
- Éole 74 (launched 15 November 1789 at Lorient) – BU 1816
- Vengeur 74 (launched 16 December 1789 at Brest) – lost June 1793
- Jean Bart 74 (launched 7 January 1790 at Lorient) – Driven ashore by the British in the Battle of the Basque Roads in February 1809 and burnt by them in April 1809
- Thésée 74 (launched 14 April 1790 at Rochefort) – Renamed Révolution in January 1793, then Finistère in February 1803
- Scipion 74 (launched 30 July 1790 at Toulon)- captured by the British at Toulon in August 1793 and burnt by them there in December 1793
- Pompée 74 (launched 28 May 1791 at Toulon) – captured by the British at Toulon in August 1793 and added to the RN under the same name, BU 1817.
- Suffren 74 (launched 31 May 1791 at Brest) – Renamed Redoutable in May 1795 – Captured by the British in the Battle of Trafalgar in October 1805 and wrecked in the subsequent storm
- Pyrrhus 74 (launched 19 August 1791 at Rochefort) – Renamed Mont Blanc in January 1793, then Trente-et-un Mai in April 1794, then Républicain in April 1795 and finally Mont Blanc again in February 1796, captured by the British in the Battle of Cape Ortegal 74 in November 1805 and added to the RN under the same name
- Thémistocle 74 (launched 12 September 1791 at Lorient) – captured by the British at Toulon in August 1793 and burnt by them there in December 1793
- Trajan 74 (launched 24 January 1792 at Lorient) – Renamed Gaulois in December 1797, BU 1805

=== 64-gun ships ("vaisseaux de 64") of the Louis XVI era ===
- Brillant, designed by Antoine Groignard. 64 (launched September 1774 at Brest) – hulked at Cherbourg in September 1787 as a guardship, taken to pieces 1797.
- Solitaire class, design by Antoine Groignard developed from his Brillant design.
  - Solitaire 64 (launched 22 October 1774 at Brest) – Captured by the British on 6 December 1782 and added to the RN under the same name, sold 1790
  - Réfléchi 64 (launched 25 November 1776 at Brest) – hulked at Brest in November 1788, raséed in 1793 and renamed Turot, not mentioned thereafter.
- Caton class, design by Antoine Groignard
  - Caton 64 (launched July 1777 at Toulon) – Captured by the British in the Caribbean on 19 April 1782, and added to the RN as HMS Caton, sold February 1815.
  - Jason 64 (launched 13 February 1779 at Toulon) – Captured by the British in the Caribbean on 19 April 1782 and added to the RN as HMS Argonaut, sold February 1831.
- Sévère class, built by François Caro for commercial operators, to the design of Antoine Groignard's Indien Class. Purchased in 1778–79 by the French Navy. A third sister-ship – the Superbe (launched 11 March 1774) was sold in 1779 to Austria.
  - Sévère 64 (launched 17 January 1775 at Lorient-Caudan, and purchased for the French Navy in November 1778) – Wrecked 26 January 1784 in Table Bay, South Africa.
  - Ajax 64 (launched 14 January 1774 at Lorient-Caudan under the name Maréchal de Broglie, and purchased for the French Navy in April 1779, being renamed Ajax on 13 August 1779) – Struck in 1786, but reinstated as a floating battery at Verdon in June 1795; taken to pieces after March 1801.
- Oriflamme class 64s – projected only in 1782. The two ships – to have been named Oriflamme and Breton – would have been built at Brest, but the project was cancelled in February 1783.

=== Captured or otherwise acquired from other navies in the Louis XVI era ===
- Ardent 64 (ex-British Ardent, captured 1779) – recaptured by the British in the Battle of the Saintes in April 1782 and added to the RN as HMS Tiger, sold 1784
- Hannibal 50 (ex-British Hannibal, captured 1782) – Deleted 1787

== First Republic (1792 to 1804) ==
The Republic was proclaimed on 21 September 1792 (although Louis XVI was not executed until 21 January 1793). The period was divided into the Convention (until 26 October 1795, during which effective power was exercised by the Committee of Public Safety), the Directory until 9 November 1799 (the Directorate was a "Cabinet" of five members), and finally the Consulate until the proclamation of the Empire on 18 May 1804.

=== First Rates ("vaisseaux de Premier Rang") of the First Republic ===
Dauphin Royal class (continued)

- République Française 118 (launched 18 April 1802 at Rochefort) – renamed Majesteux in February 1803. Broken up 1839
- Vengeur 118 (launched 1 October 1803 at Brest) – renamed Impérial in March 1805. Ran ashore and burnt in February 1806.
118-gun ships of the First Republic
Vengeur in 1806, as Impérial, at the Battle of San Domingo

=== 80-gun ships ("vaisseaux de 80") of the First Republic ===
Tonnant class (continued)

- Formidable 80 (launched 17 March 1795) – Captured 3 November 1805 during the Battle of Cape Ortegal, renamed HMS Brave, broken up April 1816
- Guillaume Tell 80 (launched 21 October 1795) – Captured 30 March 1800, renamed HMS Malta, broken up August 1840
- Franklin 80 (launched 25 June 1797) – Captured 2 August 1798 at the battle of the Nile, renamed HMS Canopus, broken up October 1887
- Indivisible 80 (launched 8 July 1799) – Renamed Alexandre 1802, captured by the British 1805, broken up May 1822
- Foudroyant 80 (launched 18 May 1799) – Broken up in 1834
80-gun ships of the First Republic
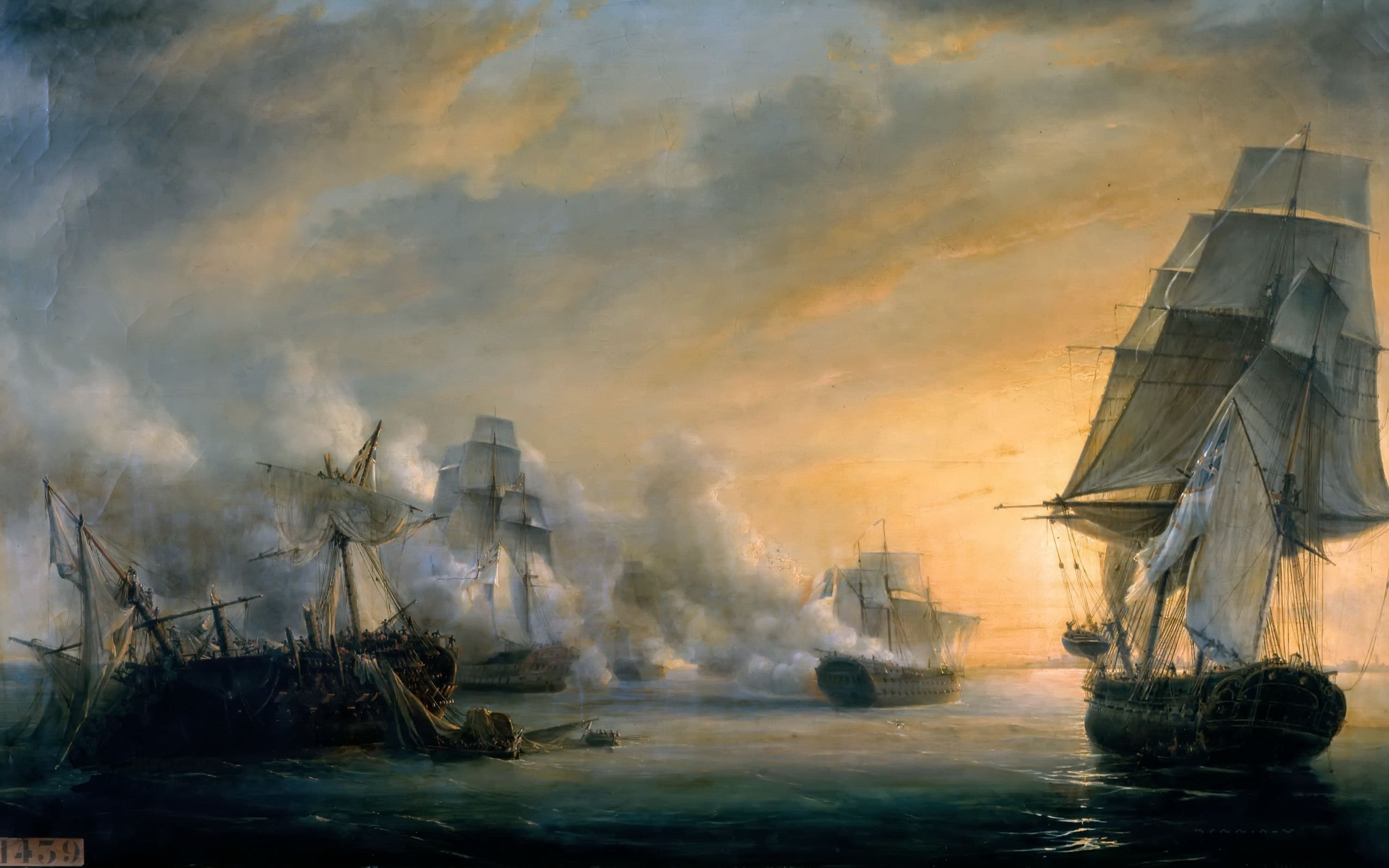
Formidable (second from right) at the Second Battle of Algeciras

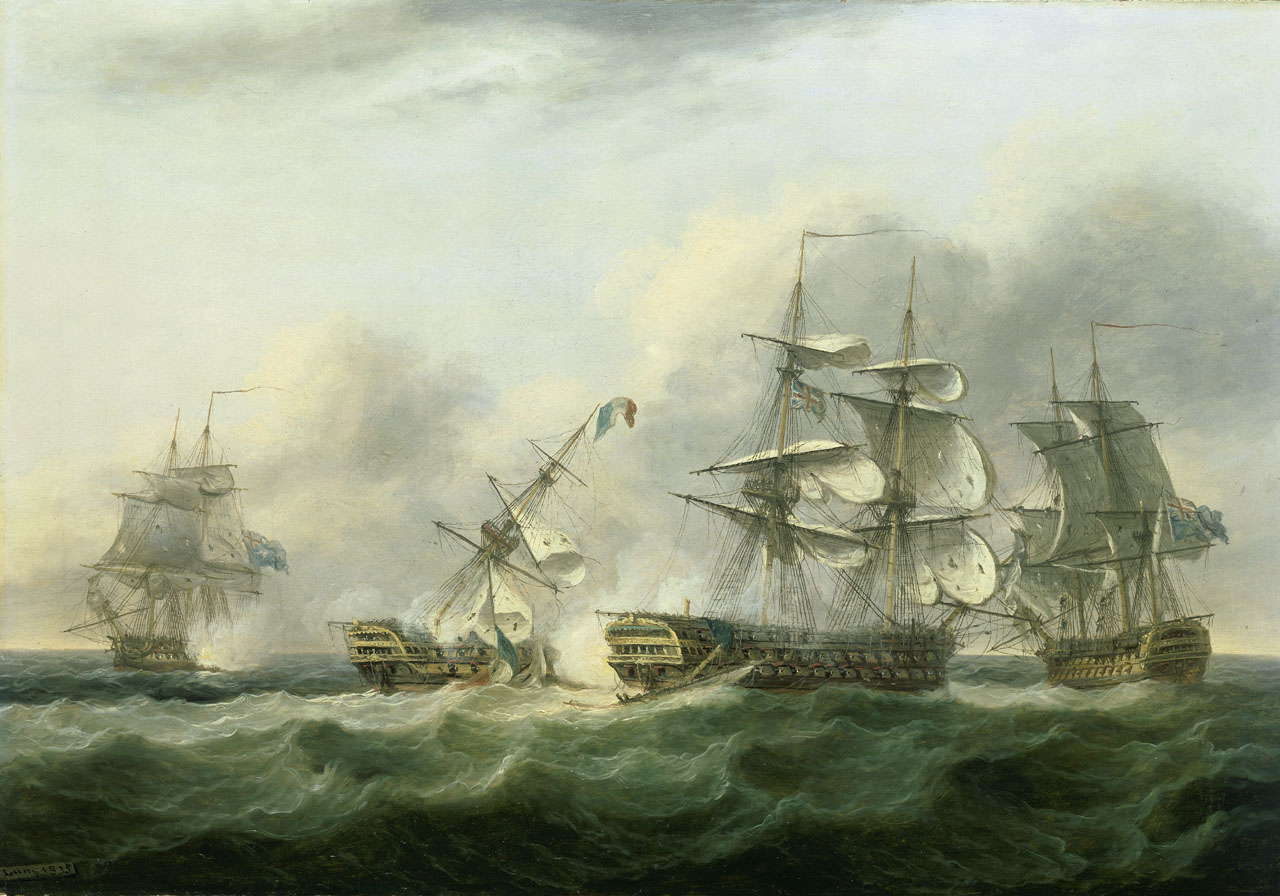
Capture of the Guillaume Tell, by Thomas Luny

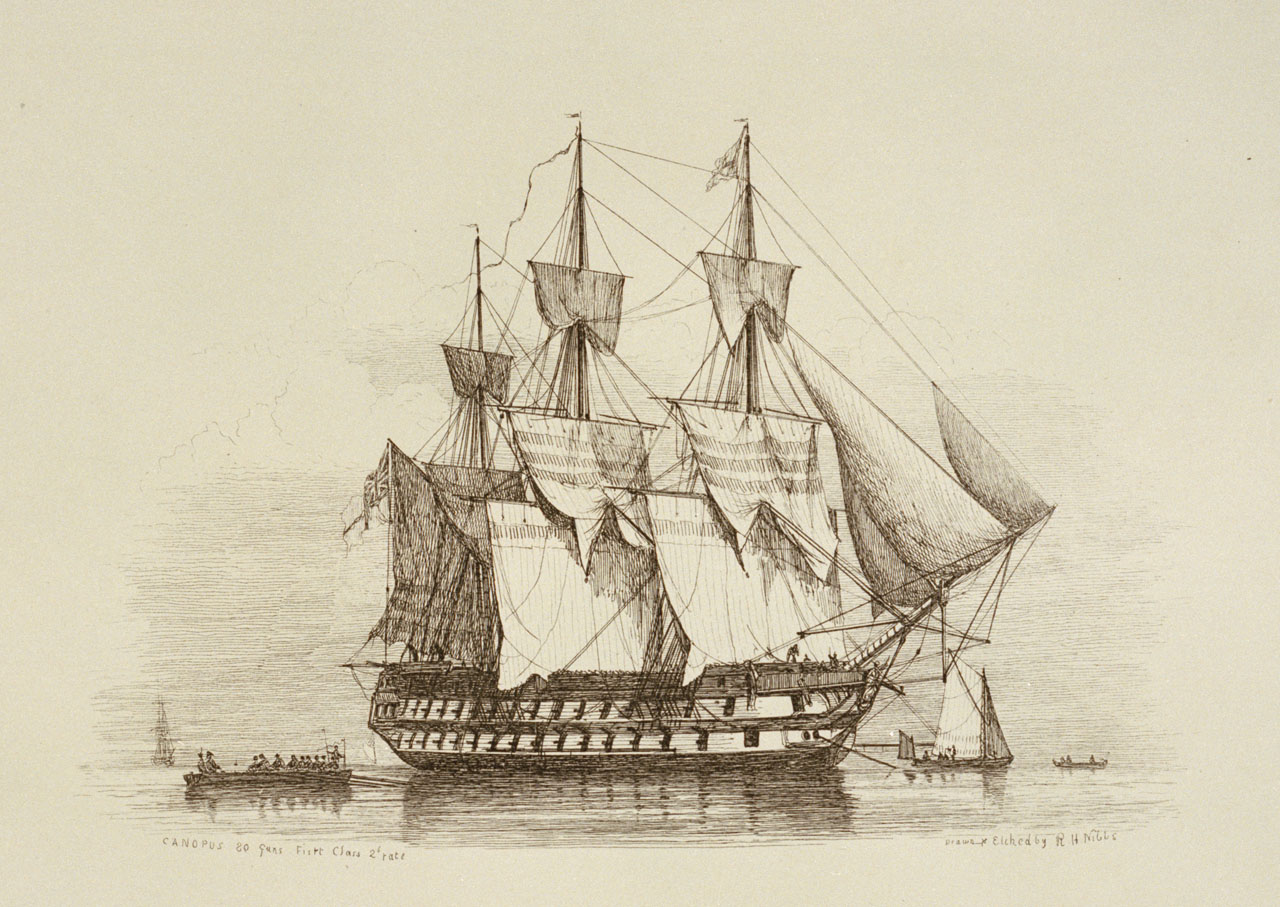
Franklin as HMS Canopus

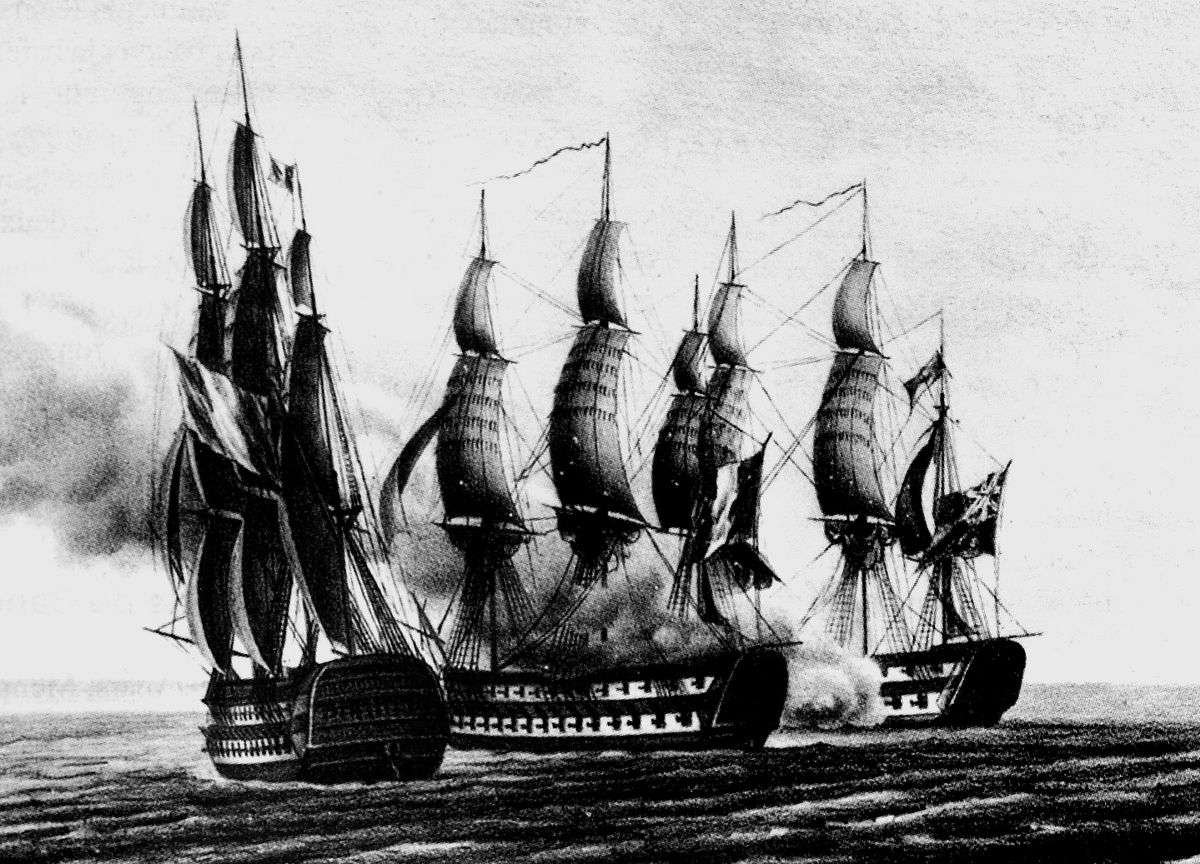
Capture of HMS Swiftsure by Indivisible and Dix-Août

=== 74-gun ships ("vaisseaux de 74") of the First Republic ===
Téméraire class (continued)

- Tigre 74 (launched 8 May 1793 at Brest) – captured by the British in the Battle of Groix in June 1795 and added to the RN under the same name, BU 1817.
- Tyrannicide 74 (launched 28 June 1793 at Lorient) – renamed Desaix in August 1800, wrecked 15 February 1802.
- Nestor 74 (launched 22 July 1793 at Brest) – renamed Cisalpin in December 1797, then Aquilon February 1803, captured and burnt by the British in the Battle of the Basque Roads in April 1809.
- Jemappes 74 (launched 22 January 1794 at Rochefort) – condemned 1820 and hulked at Rochefort, taken to pieces in 1830.
- Barra 74 (launched 23 March 1794 at Toulon) – renamed Pégase in October 1795, then Hoche in December 1797, captured by the British in the Battle of Tory Island in October 1798 and added to the RN as HMS Donegal, BU 1845.
- Marat 74 (launched 29 April 1794 at Rochefort) – renamed Formidable in May 1795, captured by the British in the Battle of Groix in June 1795 and added to the RN as HMS Belleisle, BU 1814.
- Droits de l'Homme 74 (launched 29 May 1794 at Lorient) – driven ashore and wrecked by the British in an action off Brittany in January 1797.
- Wattignies 74 (launched 8 October 1794 at Lorient) – condemned at Brest 1808 and BU there 1809.
- Cassard 74 (launched 2 May 1795 at Lorient) – renamed Dix-Août in March 1798, then Brave in February 1803, captured by the British in the Battle of San Domingo in February 1806, wrecked 1806.
- Jean-Jacques Rousseau 74 (launched 21 July 1795 at Toulon) – renamed Marengo in December 1802, captured by the British in an action in the Atlantic in March 1806 and added to the RN under the same name, BU 1816.
- Viala 74 (launched 28 September 1795 at Lorient) – Renamed Voltaire in October 1795, then Constitution in December 1795 and finally Jupiter in February 1803, captured by the British in the Battle of San Domingo in February 1806 and added to the RN as HMS Maida, sold 1814.
- Hercule 74 (launched 5 October 1797 at Lorient) – Captured by the British near Brest in April 1798 and added to the RN under the same name, BU 1810.
- Spartiate 74 (launched 24 November 1797 at Toulon) – Captured by the British in the Battle of the Nile in August 1798 and added to the RN under the same name, BU 1857.
- Quatorze Juillet 74 (launched 1 February 1798 at Lorient) – Burnt by accident in April 1798.
- Argonaute 74 (launched 22 December 1798 at Lorient) – Transferred to Spain 1806 as Argonauta as a prison hulk, wrecked in March 1810.
- Union 74 (launched 1 August 1799 at Lorient) – Renamed Diomede in February 1803, captured and burnt by the British in the Battle of San Domingo in February 1806.
- Duguay-Trouin 74 (launched 25 March 1800 at Rochefort) – Captured by the British in the Battle of Cape Ortegal in November 1805 and added to the RN as HMS Implacable, renamed Foudroyant 1943, scuttled 1949.
- Aigle 74 (launched 6 July 1800 at Rochefort) – Captured by the British in the Battle of Trafalgar in October 1805 and wrecked in the subsequent storm.
- Scipion 74 (launched 29 March 1801 at Lorient) – Captured by the British in the Battle of Cape Ortegal in November 1805 and added to the RN under the same name, BU 1819.
- Héros 74 (launched 10 May 1801 at Rochefort) – captured by the Spanish at Cadiz in June 1808 and renamed Heroe, stricken 1839 at Ferrol.
- Pacificateur 74 (started 1801 at Brest) – construction begun in May 1801 and abandoned soon after, never launched. Broken up circa 1803.
- Brutus 74 (launched 24 January 1803 at Lorient) – renamed Impétueux in February 1803; burnt by the British in Chesapeake Bay in August 1806
- Magnanime 74 (launched 17 August 1803 at Rochefort) – became floating prison Bagne No 1 in 1816 and struck 1820.
- Suffren 74 (launched 17 September 1803 at Lorient) – condemned 1816 and taken to pieces in 1823.
- Lion 74 (launched 11 February 1804 at Rochefort) – Driven ashore by the British and burnt near Frontignan in October 1809.

Cassard class
This design by Jacques-Noël Sané was enlarged from the Téméraire Class in order to mount an upper deck battery of 24pdrs compared with the 18pdrs of the earlier class. They were begun in 1793 and 1794 respectively as Lion and Magnanime, but were renamed Glorieux (subsequently Cassard) and Quatorze Juillet in 1798; the second ship became Vétéran in 1802.

- Cassard 74 (launched 24 September 1803 at Brest) – struck and hulked in 1818, and taken to pieces in 1831–32.
- Vétéran 74 (launched 18 July 1803 at Brest) – struck in 1833, and taken to pieces in 1841–42.
Cassard-class ships of the First Republic
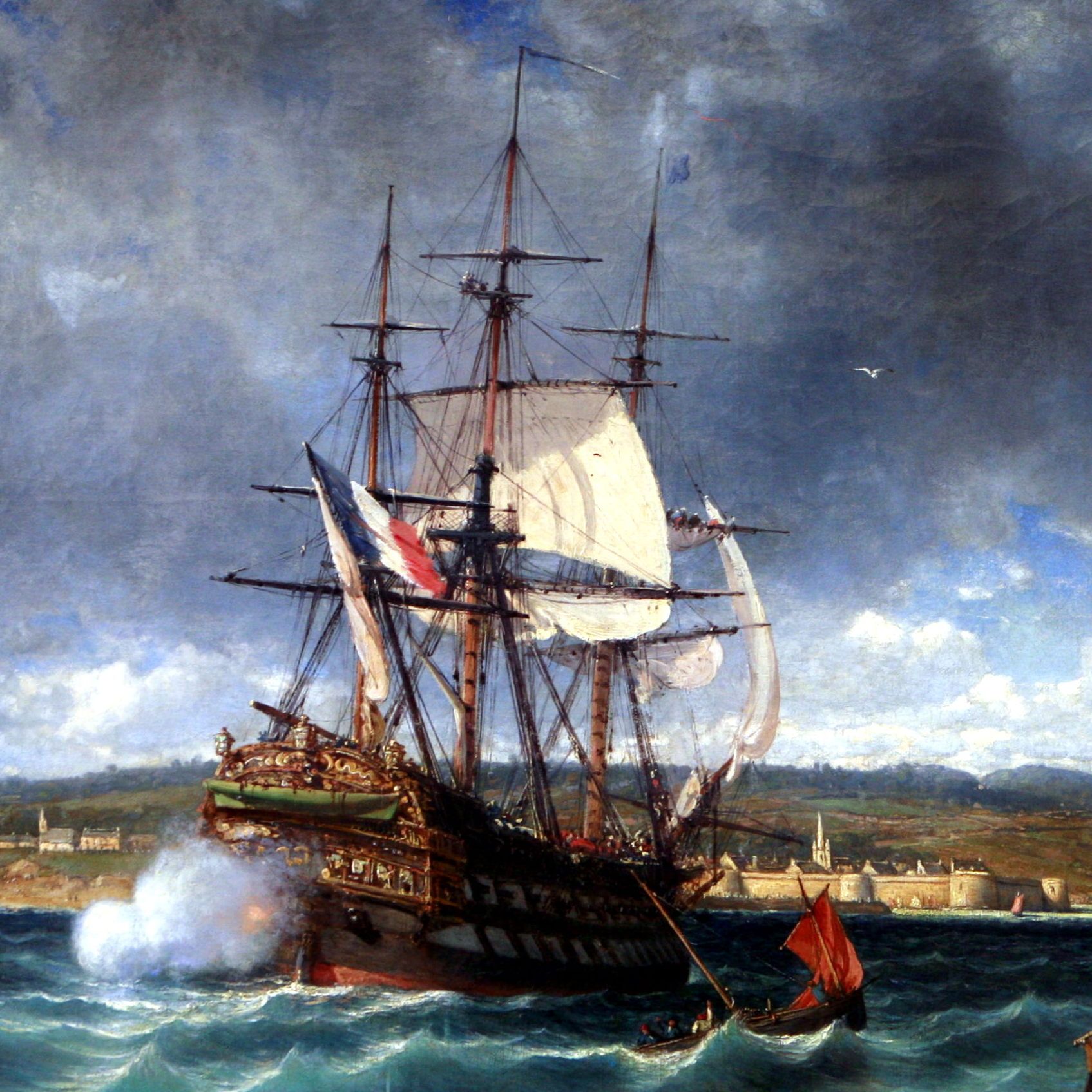
Vétéran escaping into the shallow waters of Concarneau harbour. Painting by Michel Bouquet, on display at Brest Fine arts museum.

=== Captured or otherwise acquired from foreign navies during the First Republic ===
- Alexandre 74 (ex-British Alexander, captured 1793) – Captured by the British in the Battle of Groix in June 1795 and added to the RN as HMS Alexander, BU 1819
- Berwick 74 (1775, ex-British Berwick, captured 1795) – Captured by the British in the Battle of Trafalgar in October 1805 and wrecked in the subsequent storm
- Causse 70/64 (1792, ex-Venetian Vulcano, captured at Venice 1797) – Captured by the British in 1801
- Dubois 66 (1784, ex-Venetian Fama, captured at Venice 1797) – BU 1801
- Robert 70 (1785, ex-Venetian Eolo, captured at Venice 1797)
- Sandos 70 (1785, ex-Venetian San Giorgio, captured at Venice 1797)
- Frontin 70 (1793, ex-Venetian Medea, captured at Venice 1797)
- Banel (1794, ex-Venetian Gloria, captured at Venice 1797)
- Dégo 64 (1765, ex-Maltese San Zacharia, captured at Malta 1798) – Captured by the British at Malta in September 1800
- Athénien 64 (1798, ex-Maltese San Giovanni, captured at Malta 1798) – Captured by the British at Malta in September 1800, wrecked in a storm 1806
- Leander 53 (1780, ex-British Leander, captured 1798) – Captured by the Russians 1799, returned to Britain, hospital ship 1806, renamed Hygeia 1813, sold 1817
- Alliance 74 (1783, ex-Spanish San Sebastian, obtained 1799) – Stricken 1807
- Aigle (c. 1799)
- Saint Antoine 74 (ex-Spanish San Antonio, obtained 1800) – Captured by the British in the Battle of Algeciras Bay in July 1801 and added to the RN as HMS San Antonio, sold 1828
- Hannibal 74 (1786, ex-British Hannibal, captured in the Battle of Algeciras Bay in July 1801)
- Conquérant 74 (1791, ex-Spanish Conquistador, obtained 1801) – disarmed in Brest 21 September 1802
- Intrépide 74 (1790, ex-Spanish Intrepido, obtained 1801) – Captured by the British in the Battle of Trafalgar in October 1805 and wrecked in the subsequent storm.
- Desaix 74 (1792, ex-Spanish Pelayo, obtained 1801) – Stricken 1804
- Ulysse 74 (1765, ex-Spanish San Genaro, obtained 1801) – Renamed Tourville, stricken 1822
- Atlas 74 (1754, ex-Spanish Atlante, obtained 1801) – Captured by the Spanish at Cadiz in June 1808, same name, BU 1817
- Swiftsure 74 (1787, ex-British Swiftsure, captured 1801) – Re-captured by the British in the Battle of Trafalgar in October 1805 and added to the RN as Irresistible, BU 1816
- Calcutta 56 (1795, ex-British Calcutta, previously British East Indiaman Warley, captured 1805) – Burnt by the British in the Battle of the Basque Roads in April 1809

== First Empire (1804 to 1815) ==
Napoléon Bonaparte was proclaimed Emperor on 18 May 1804 and ruled until he abdicated on 6 April 1814, at which time the Bourbon monarchy resumed under Louis XVIII. The Empire was briefly restored during the Hundred Days from 20 March to 22 June 1815; this section of the article includes all ships of the line launched from May 1804 to June 1815.

=== 118-gun ships ("vaisseaux de 118") of the First Empire ===
Later Dauphin Royal class (118-gun ships, continued)

- Austerlitz 118 (launched 15 August 1808 at Toulon) – Condemned 8 March 1837 at Brest.
- Wagram 118 (launched 1 July 1810 at Toulon) – Condemned 15 October 1836 at Brest.
- Impérial 118 (launched 1 December 1811 at Toulon) – Renamed Royal Louis April 1814, renamed Impérial March 1815, renamed Royal Louis July 1815, condemned 31 March 1825 at Toulon.
- Montebello 118 (launched 6 December 1812 at Toulon) – Rebuilt 1851–52 as steam battleship, stricken 1867, BU 1889 at Toulon.
- Héros 118 (launched 15 August 1813 at Toulon) – Condemned 10 March 1828 at Toulon.
- Roi de Rome 118 (building at Brest, never completed and broken up on the slip after 1815)
118-gun ships of the First Empire
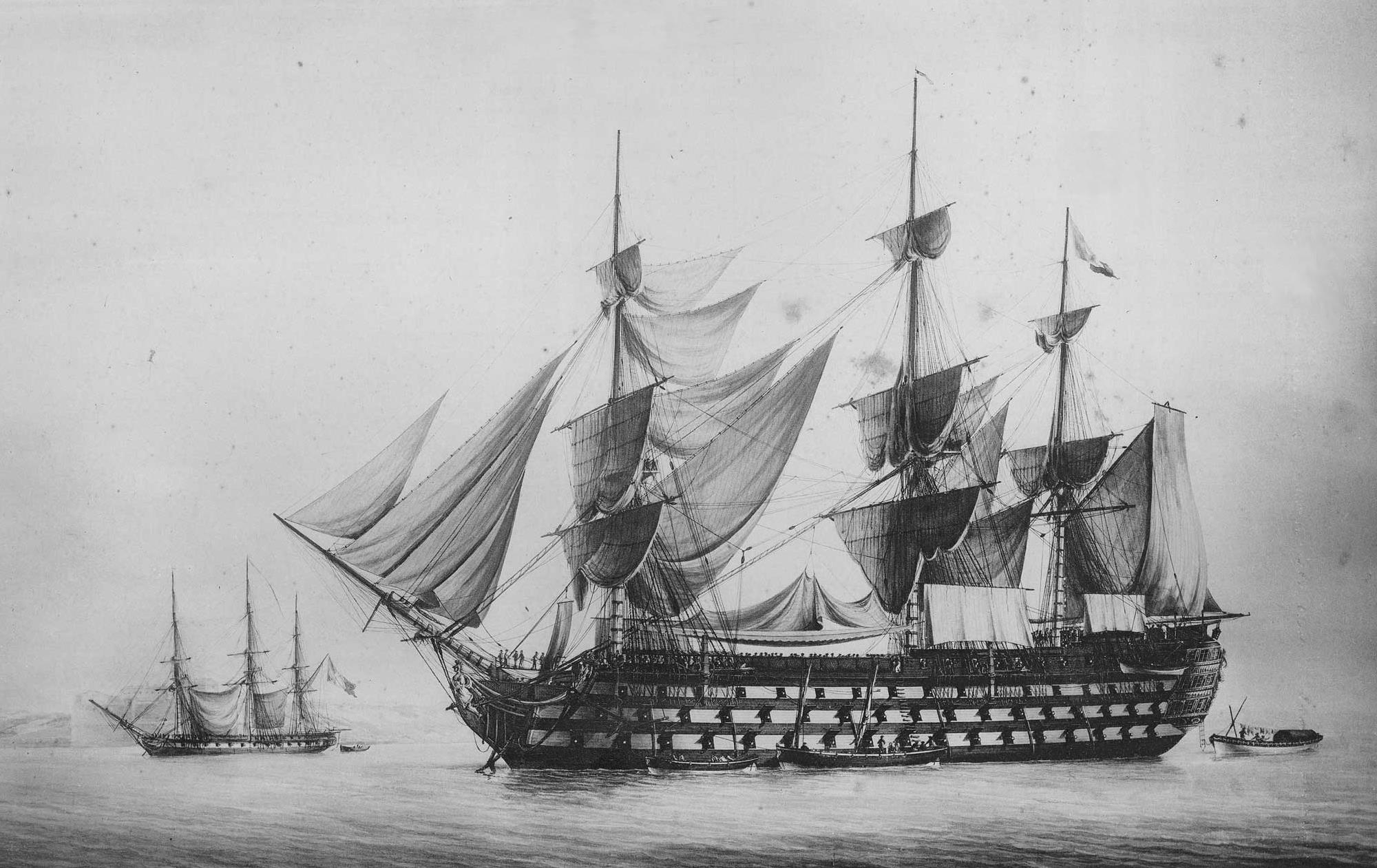
Portrait of Wagram, by François Roux

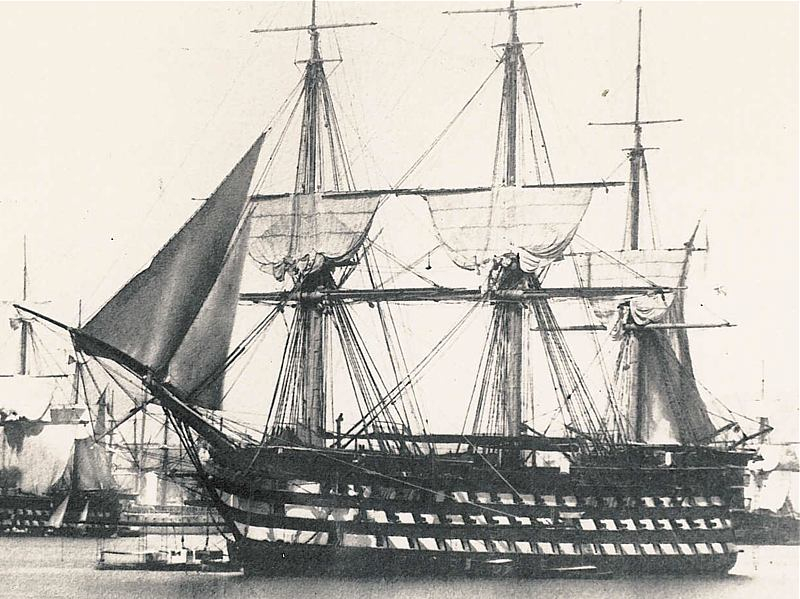
Montebello photographed around 1850

=== 110-gun ships ("vaisseaux de 110") of the First Empire ===
Commerce de Paris class, design by Jacques-Noël Sané, shortened from his 118-gun design by removing one pair of guns from each deck.

- Commerce de Paris 110 (launched 8 August 1806 at Toulon) – razeed by one battery 1822–1825, renamed Commerce on 11 August 1830, then Borda on 18 December 1839, then Vulcain on 10 August 1863. Broken up at Brest 1885,
- Duc d'Angoulème 110 (launched 30 August 1814 at Rochefort) – renamed Iéna on 23 March 1815, reverting to Duc d'Angoulème on 15 July 1815, and renamed Iéna again on 9 August 1830; stricken 31 December 1864.
- Hymen 110 (begun May 1810 at Antwerp) – construction abandoned October 1814 and broken up on the slip.
- Monarque 110 (begun August 1810 at Antwerp) – renamed Wagram 15 December 1810, construction abandoned October 1814 and broken up on the slip.
- Neptune 110 (begun May 1811 at Antwerp) – construction abandoned October 1814 and broken up on the slip.
- Terrible 110 (begun July 1811 at Antwerp) – construction abandoned October 1814 and broken up on the slip.
110-gun ships of the First Empire
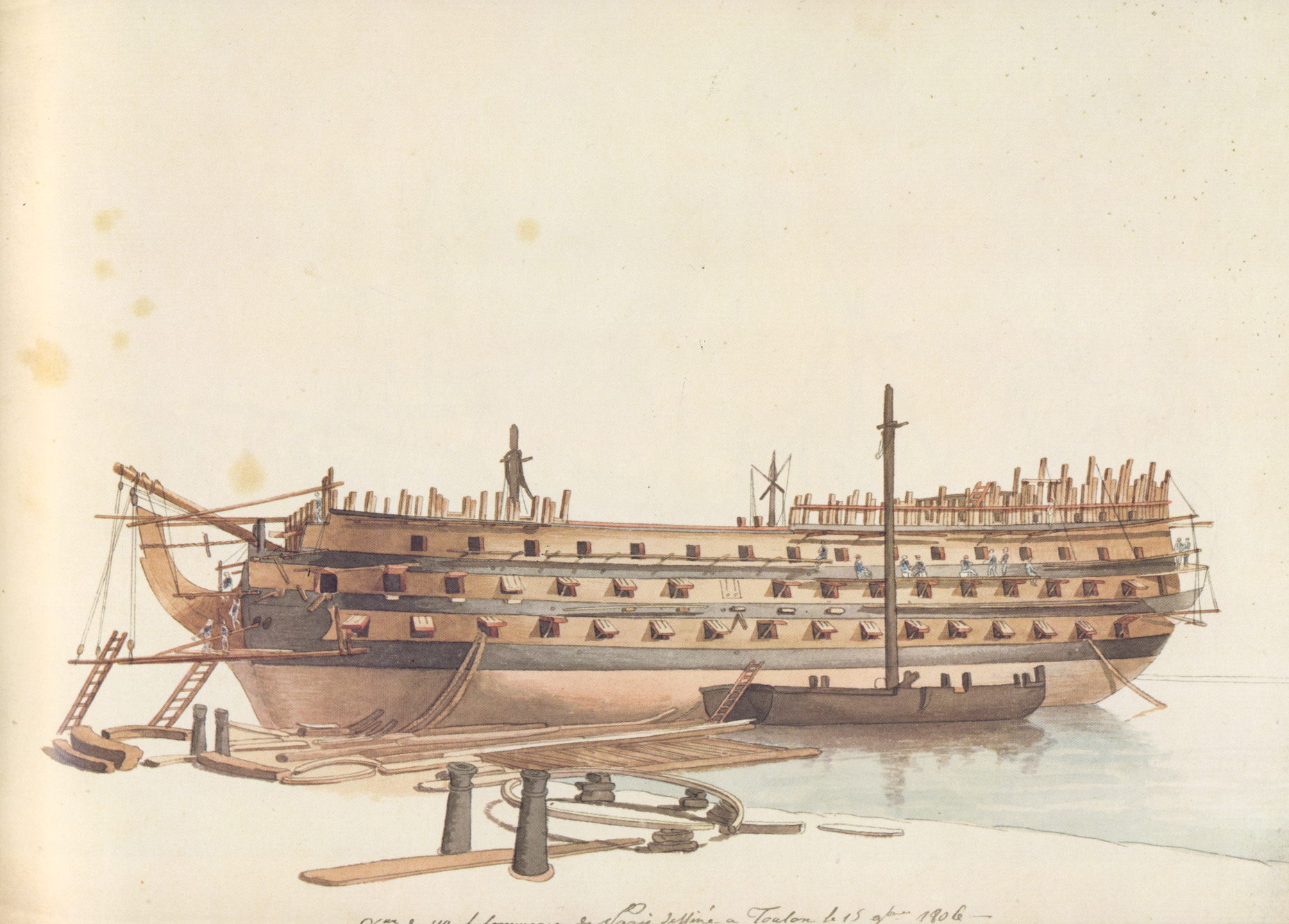
Portrait of Commerce de Paris under construction, by Antoine Roux.

=== 90-gun ships ("vaisseaux de 90") of the First Empire ===
This group comprised two small three-deckers built at Rotterdam from 1799 for the Batavian Navy, and annexed to France when the Dutch state was absorbed by the French Empire in 1810. Both were reclassed as 80-gun ships in April 1811.

Chattam-class 90-gun ships designed by P. Glavimans.

- Chattam (or Chatham) 90 (launched May 1800 at Rotterdam-Glavim) – taken by the British at the capture of Antwerp, and handed over to the Netherlands Navy in August 1814.
- Royal Hollandais 90 (launched July 1806 at Rotterdam-Glavim) – renamed Hollandais 1811; taken by the British at the capture of Antwerp, and handed over to the Netherlands Navy in August 1814, renamed Koninklijke Hollander.

=== 80-gun ships ("vaisseaux de 80") of the First Empire ===
Bucentaure class 80-gun ships designed by Jacques-Noël Sané, a modification of the 80-ship Tonnant class listed above. 21 ships were launched to this design, of which 16 were afloat by the end of 1814

- Bucentaure 80 (launched 13 July 1803 at Toulon) – Flagship at the Battle of Trafalgar, 21 October 1805, captured there by the British and wrecked in the subsequent storm
- Neptune 80 (launched 15 August 1803 at Toulon) – Captured by the Spanish at Cadiz in June 1808, renamed Neptuno, BU 1820
- Robuste 80 (launched 30 October 1806 at Toulon) – Driven ashore by the British and burnt near Frontignan in October 1809
- Ville de Varsovie 80 (launched 10 May 1808 at Rochefort) – Captured and burnt by the British in the Battle of the Basque Roads in April 1809
- Donawerth 80 (launched 4 July 1808 at Toulon) – BU 1824
- Eylau 80 (launched 19 November 1808 at Lorient) – BU 1829
- Friedland 80 (launched 2 May 1810 at Antwerp) – Transferred to the Dutch Navy in August 1814 and renamed Vlaming, BU 1823
- Sceptre 80 (launched 15 August 1810 at Toulon) – Condemned 1828
- Tilsitt 80 (launched 25 August 1810 at Antwerp) – Transferred to the Dutch Navy in August 1814 and renamed Neptunus, BU 1818
- Auguste 80 (launched 25 April 1811 at Antwerp) – Transferred to the Dutch Navy in August 1814 and renamed Illustre, returned in September 1814, BU 1827
- Pacificateur 80 (launched 22 May 1811 at Antwerp) – BU 1824
- Illustre 80 (launched 9 June 1811 at Antwerp) – Transferred to the Dutch Navy in August 1814 and renamed Prins van Oranje, BU 1825.
- Diadème (Note: Note that in 1837 the surviving 80-gun ships were re-armed and re-designated as 86-gun ships (with 14 × 12-pounder guns and 10 × 36-pounder carronades on the gaillards).) 80 (launched 1 December 1811 at Lorient) – 86 guns from 1837; condemned 1856.
- Conquérant 80 (launched 27 April 1812 at Antwerp) – Condemned 1831.
- Zélandais 80 (launched 12 October 1813 at Cherbourg) – renamed Duquesne in April 1814, but reverted to Zélandais in March 1815 then Duquesne again in July 1815. Condemned 1858.
- Magnifique 80 (launched 29 October 1814 at Lorient) – 86 guns from 1837; condemned 1837.
- One further ship begun at Venice to this design was never launched – Saturne, which was broken up on the stocks by the Austrian occupiers.
80-gun ships of the First Empire
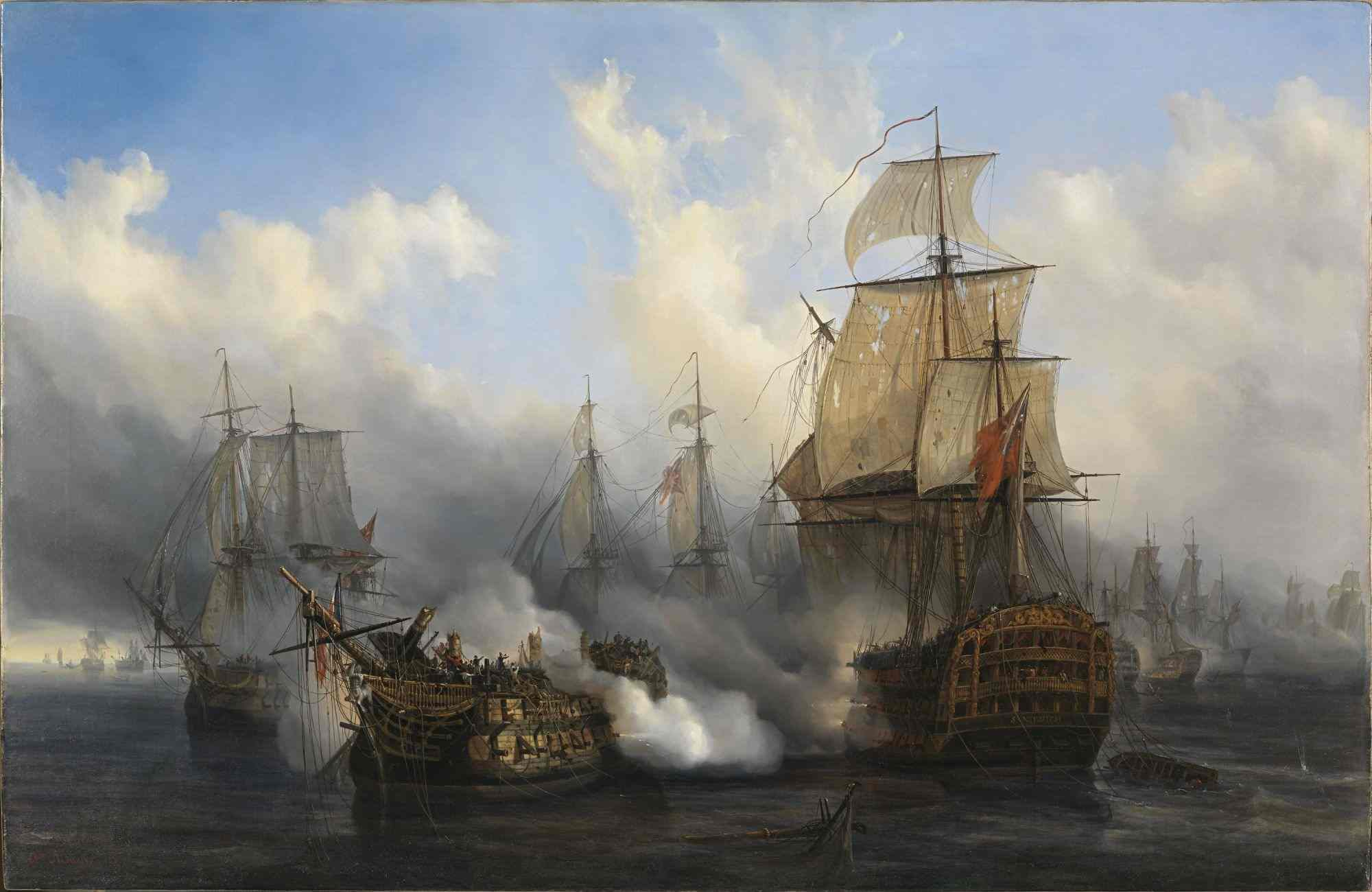
Bucentaure at the Battle of Trafalgar, by Auguste Mayer

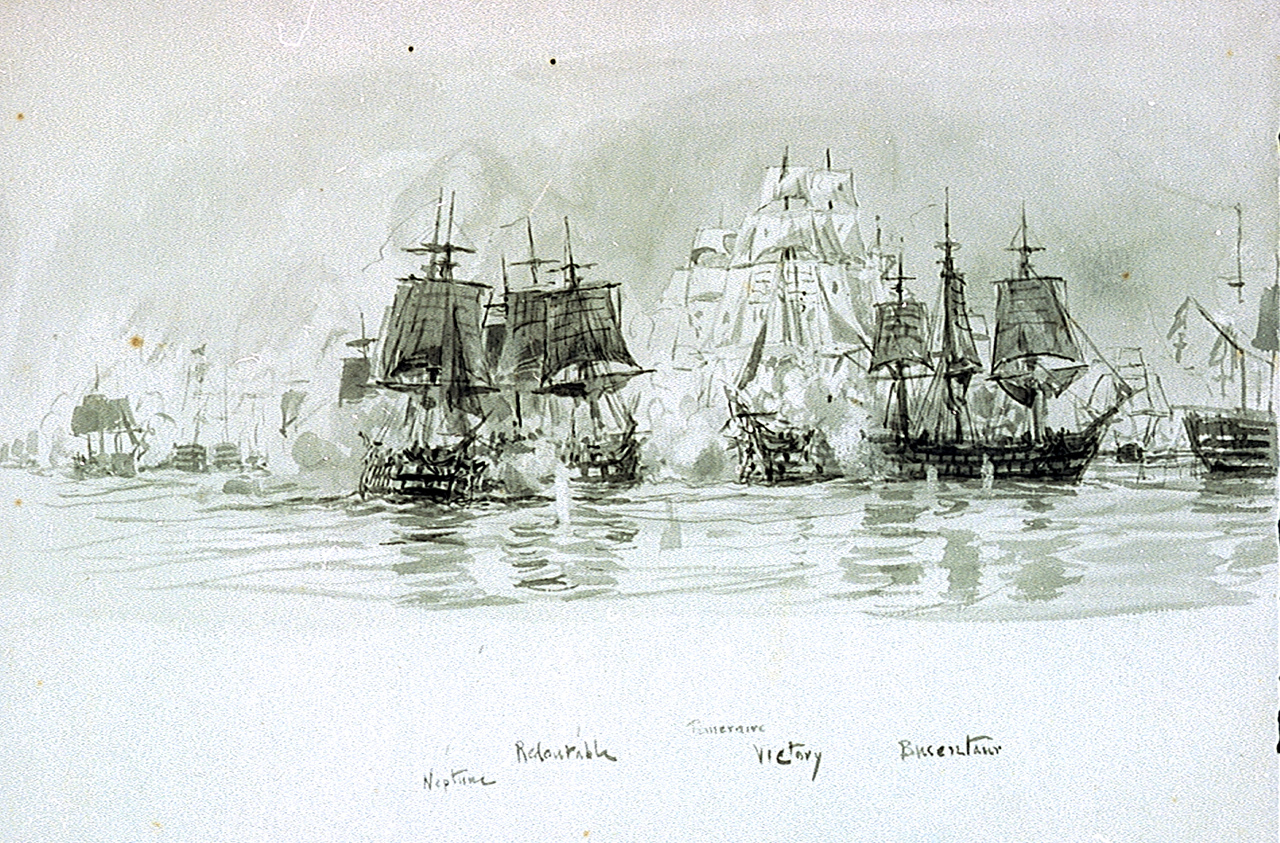
Named Vessels at the Battle of Trafalgar, William Lionel Wyllie. Leftmost ship in the foreground is Neptune, shown alongside the French Redoutable

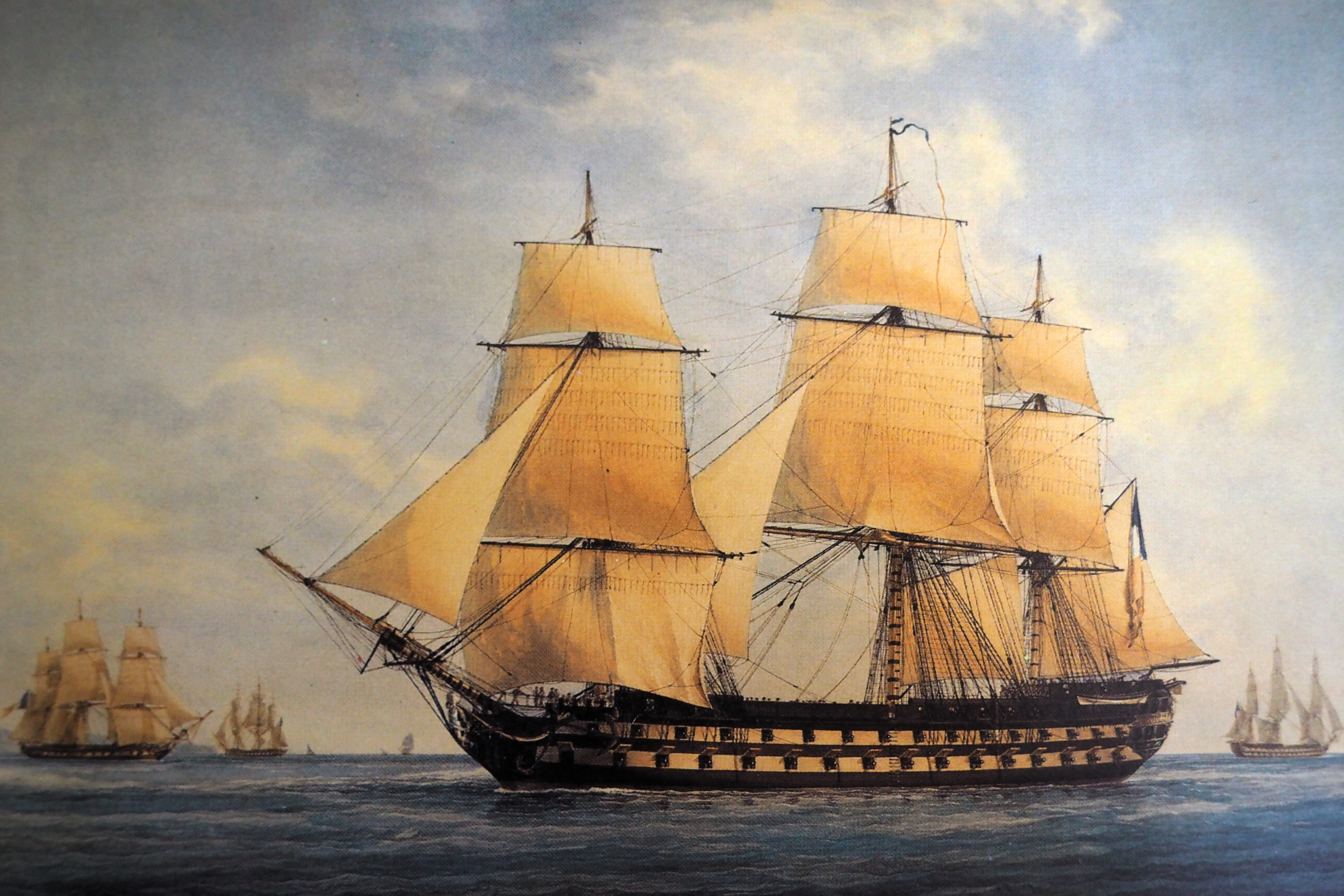
Portrait of Robuste, by Antoine Roux

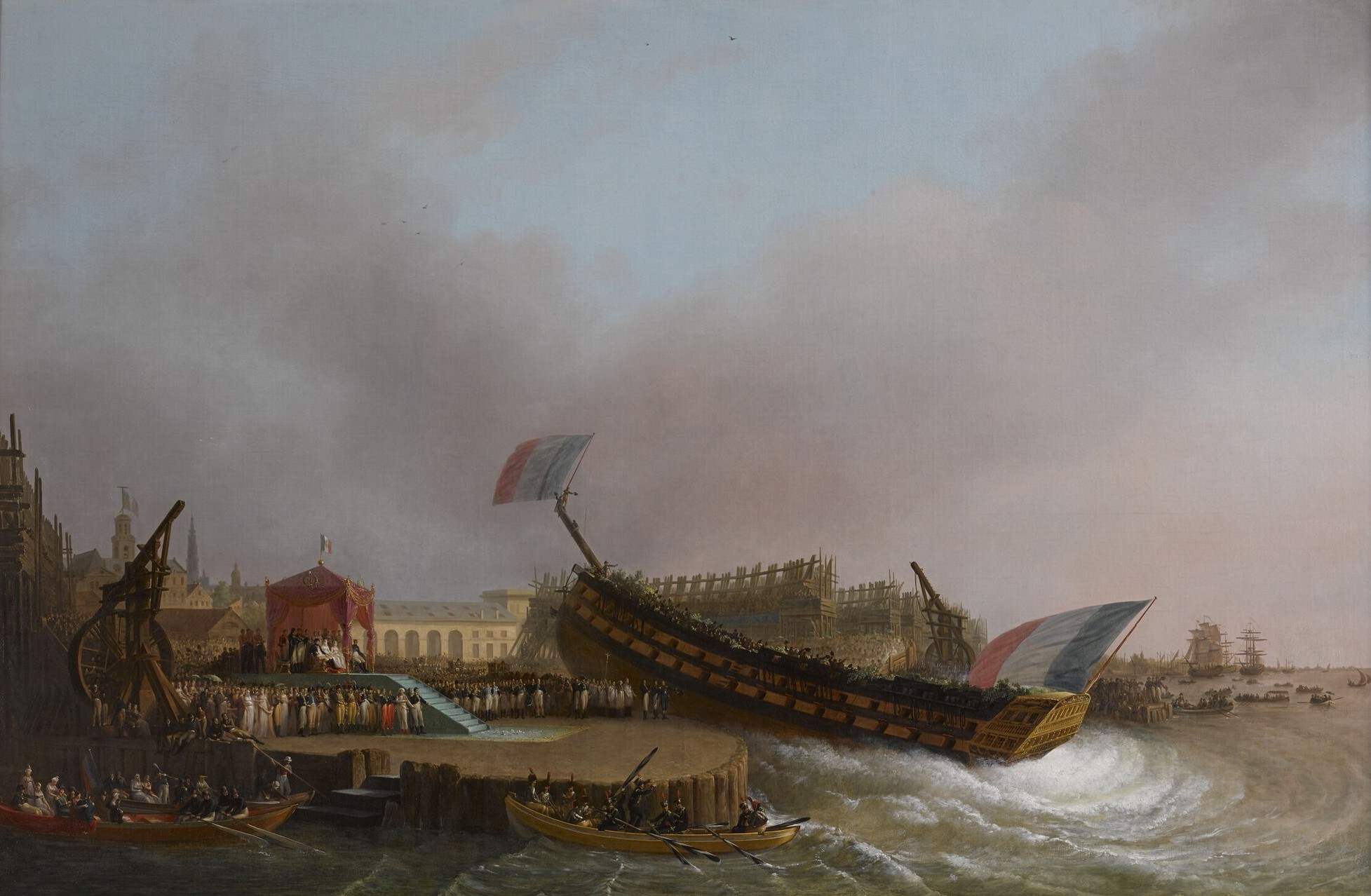
Launching of Friedland, by Mattheus Ignatius van Bree

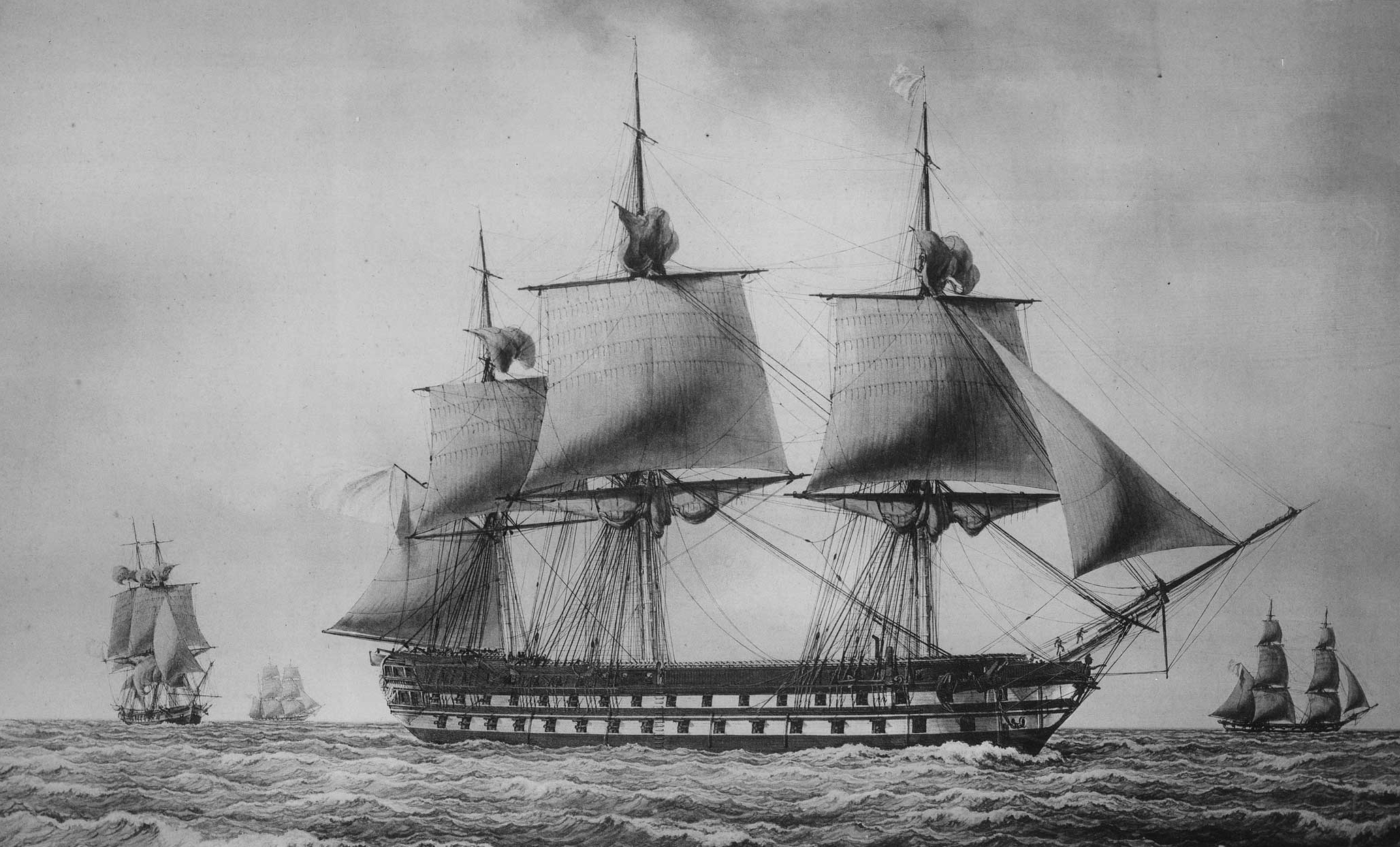
Portrait of Conquérant, by François Roux

=== 74-gun ships ("vaisseaux de 74") of the First Empire ===
Téméraire class (continued)

- Algésiras 74 (launched 8 July 1804 at Lorient) – Captured by the British in the Battle of Trafalgar in October 1805, retaken by the French two days later, captured by the Spanish at Cadiz in June 1808, renamed Algeciras, stricken 1826
- Achille 74 (launched 17 November 1804 at Rochefort) – Burnt by the British in the Battle of Trafalgar in October 1805.
- Régulus 74 (launched 15 April 1805 at Lorient) – burned in April 1813 in the Gironde to avoid capture.
- Courageux 74 (launched 3 February 1806 at Lorient) – struck 1827 and taken to pieces in 1831–32.
- Ajax 74 (launched 17 June 1806 at Rochefort) – struck 1818.
- D'Hautpoul 74 (launched 2 September 1807 at Lorient) – captured by the British in an action in the Caribbean in April 1809 and added to the RN as HMS Abercrombie, sold 1817
- Polonais 74 (launched 25 May 1808 at Lorient) – renamed Lys 1814, renamed Polonais 1815, renamed Lys 1815, BU 1825
- Tonnerre 74 (launched 9 June 1808 at Brest) – Burnt by the British in the Battle of the Basque Roads in April 1809
- Danube 74 (launched 21 December 1808 at Toulon) = school ship 1822, struck and taken to pieces in 1826.
- Golymin 74 (launched 8 December 1809 at Lorient) – wrecked and sank 1814.
- Triomphant 74 (launched 31 March 1809 at Rochefort)
- Ulm 74 (launched 25 May 1809 at Toulon)
- Marengo (Note: Note that in 1837 the surviving 74-gun ships were re-armed and re-designated as 80-gun ships.) 74 (launched 12 October 1810 at Lorient) – 80 guns from 1837; renamed Pluton 1866, BU 1873
- Nestor 74 (launched 21 May 1810 at Brest) – 80 guns from 1837.
- Trajan 74 (launched 15 August 1811 at Antwerp)
- Trident 74 (launched 9 June 1811 at Toulon) – 80 guns from 1837; BU 1879
- Agamemnon 74 (launched 23 February 1812 at Genoa) – raséed 1822–23 at Brest, becoming 1st Class 58-gun frigate, renamed Amphitrite in April 1824; deleted 1836.
- Gaulois 74 (launched 14 April 1812 at Antwerp) – taken to pieces 1831.
- Romulus 74 (launched 31 May 1812 at Toulon) – raséed 1820–21 at Brest, becoming 1st Class 58-gun frigate, renamed Guerrière in June 1921, BU 1840
- Ville de Marseille 74 (launched 15 August 1812 at Toulon) – 80 guns from 1837; BU 1827
- Colosse 74 (launched 5 December 1813 at Toulon) – raséed 1825–27 at Brest, becoming 1st Class 58-gun frigate, renamed Pallas in 1825; deleted 1840, taken to pieces 1854.
- Duguay-Trouin 74 (launched 10 November 1813 at Cherbourg)
- Orion 74 (launched 9 October 1813 at Brest)
- Scipion 74 (launched 5 September 1813 at Genoa) – 80 guns from 1837.
- Superbe 74 (launched 5 July 1814 at Antwerp)
- Hercule 74 (launched 26 May 1815 at Toulon) – renamed Provence on 19 April 1814, Hercule on 23 March 1815, Provence on 15 July 1815, and Alger on 15 July 1830; 80 guns from 1837; BU 1881
- Brillant 74 (launched in 1815 at Genoa by the British Royal Navy) – taken by the British at the Surrender of Genoa in 1814 and finished by the Royal Navy in 1815.
Téméraire-class ships of the First Empire
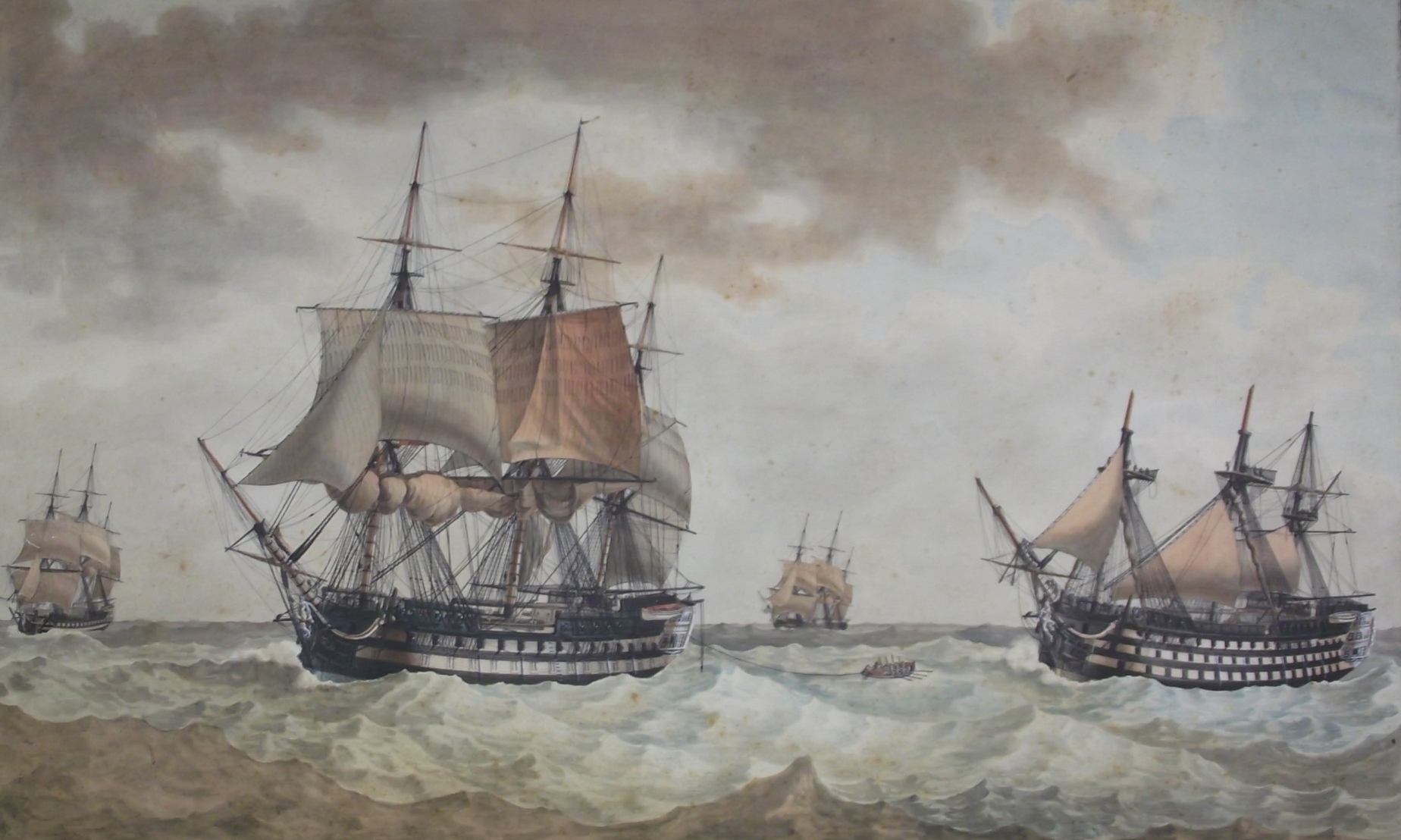
Magnanime towing Commerce de Paris, by Ange-Joseph Antoine Roux, 1809.

Scale model of Achille on display at the Musée national de la Marine in Paris.

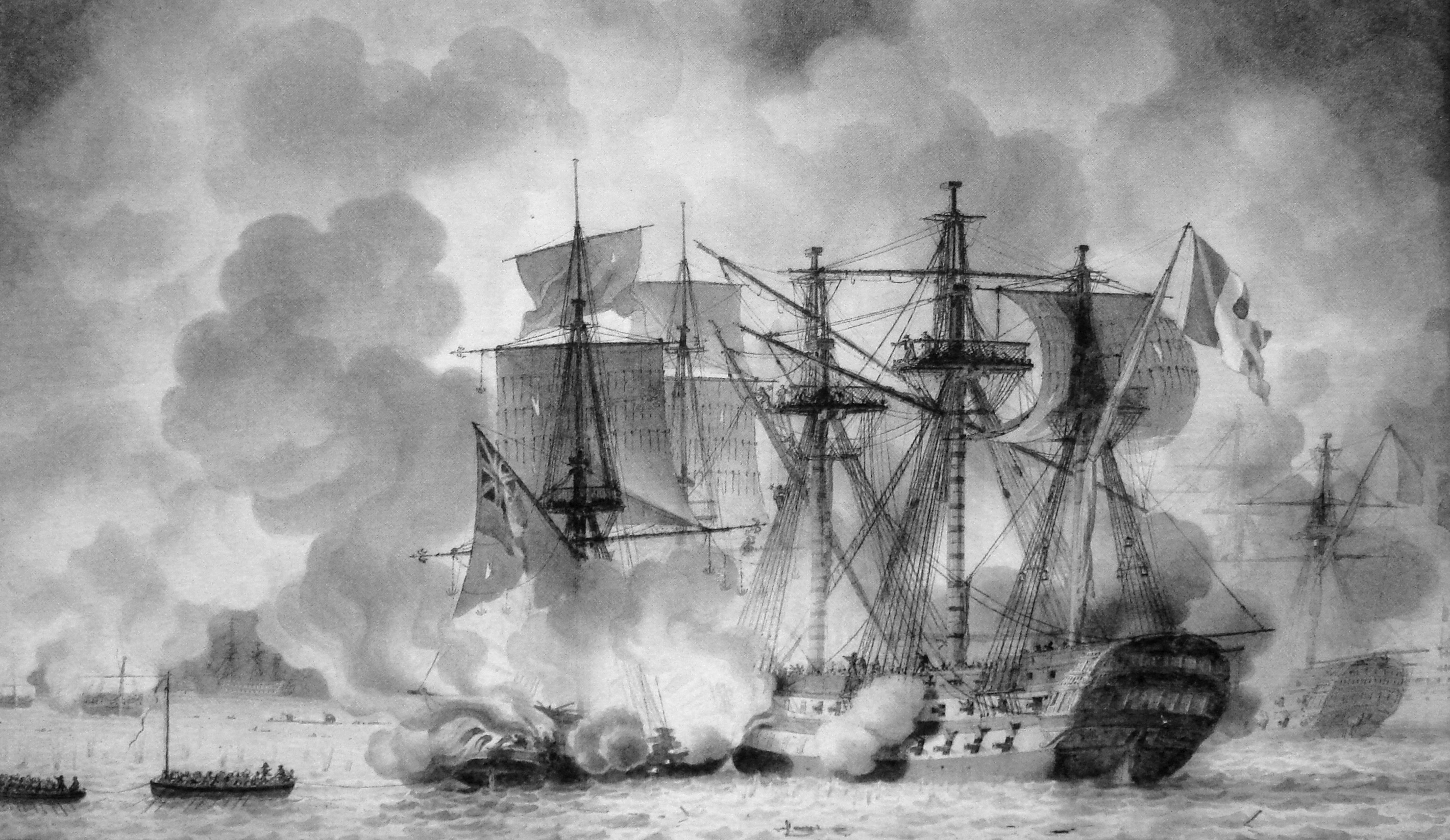
Régulus under attack by British fireships, during the evening of 11 August 1809. Drawing by Louis-Philippe Crépin.

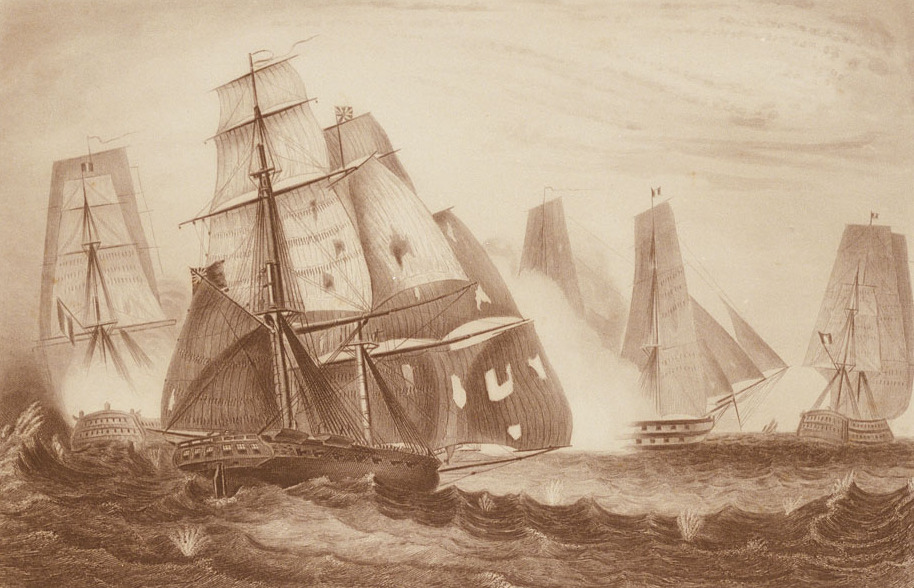
Recruit fighting D'Hautpoul on 15 April 1809.

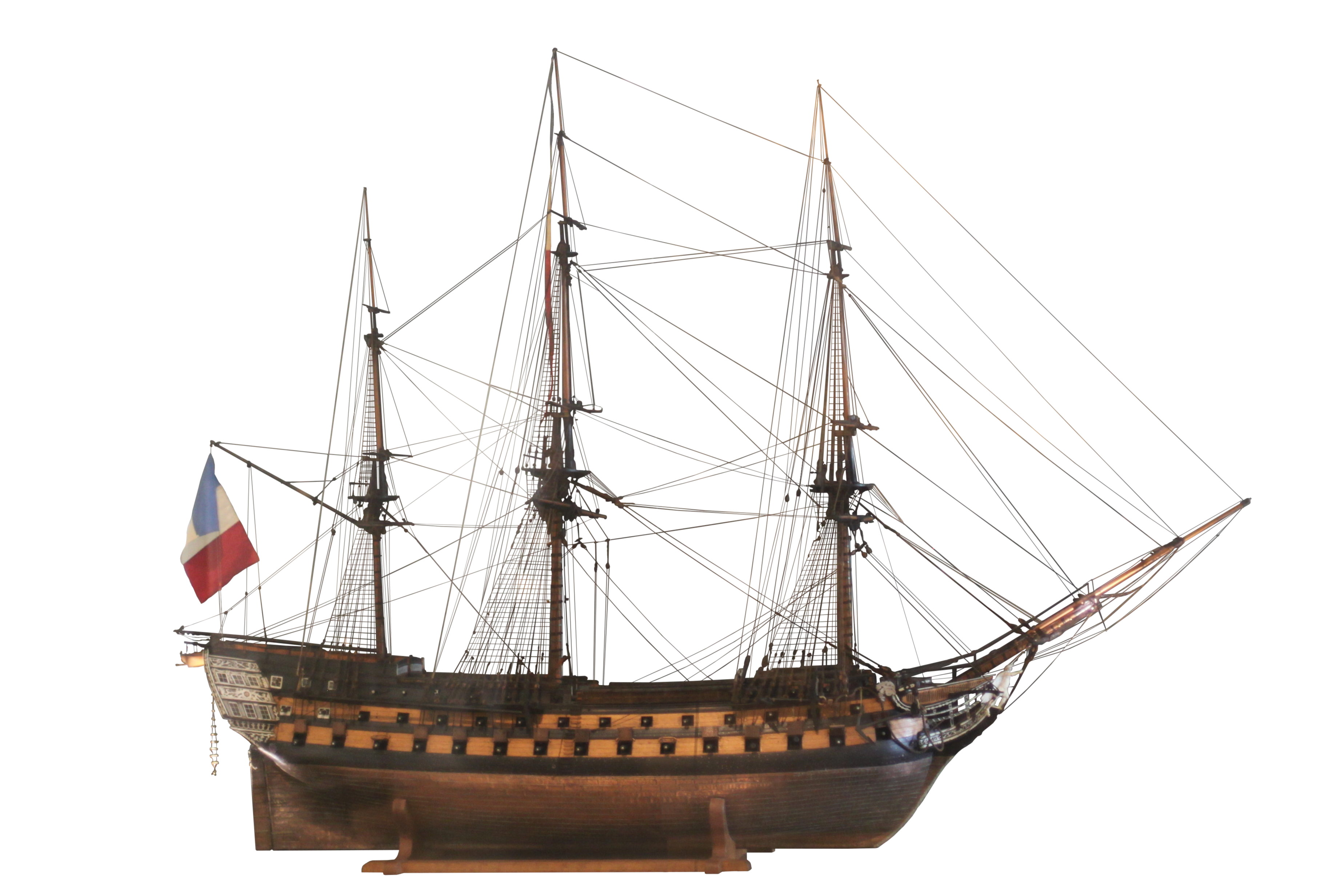
Model of Triomphant, part of the Trianon model collection, on display at the Musée national de la Marine in Paris.

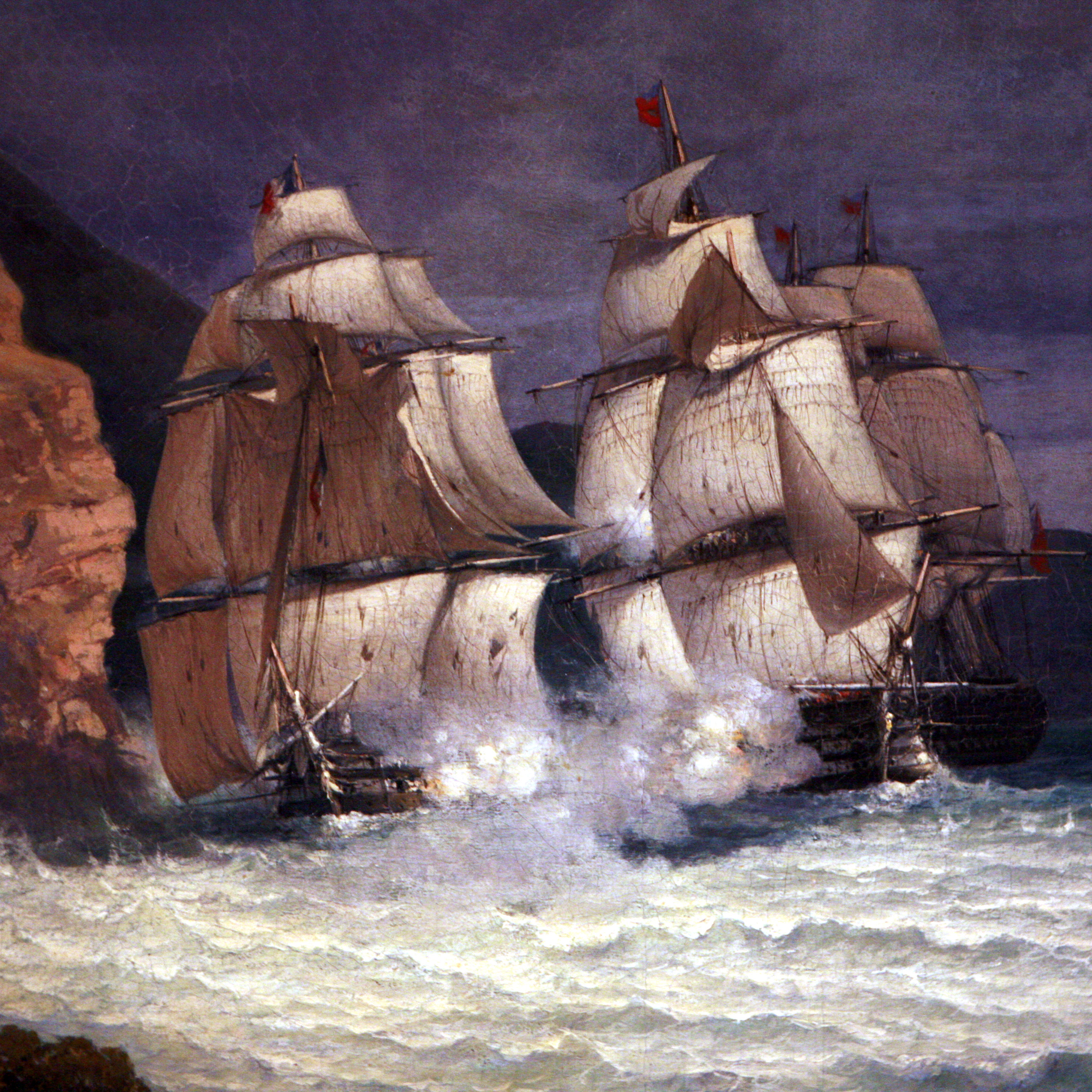
Fight of Romulus against HMS Boyne and HMS Caledonia, by Vincent Courdouan (1848)

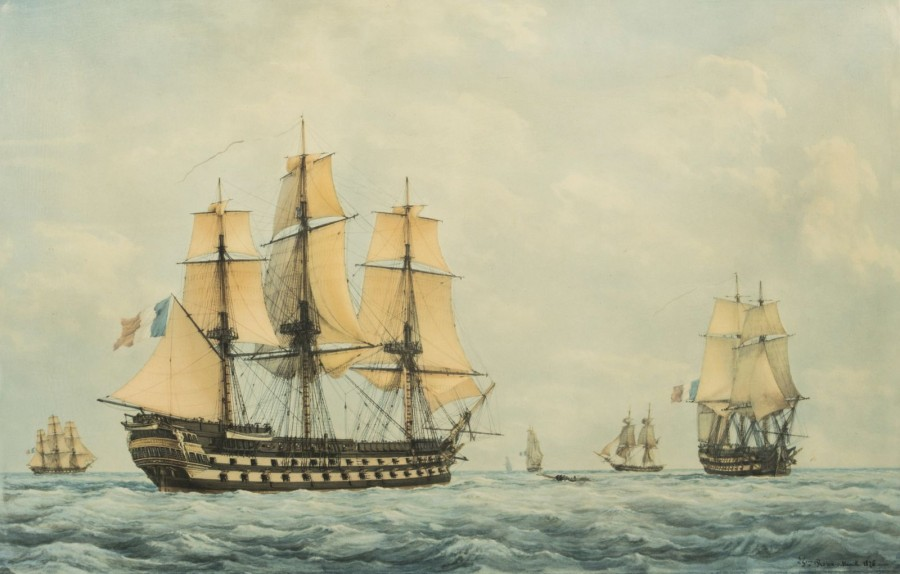
Portrait of Ville de Marseille, by François Roux

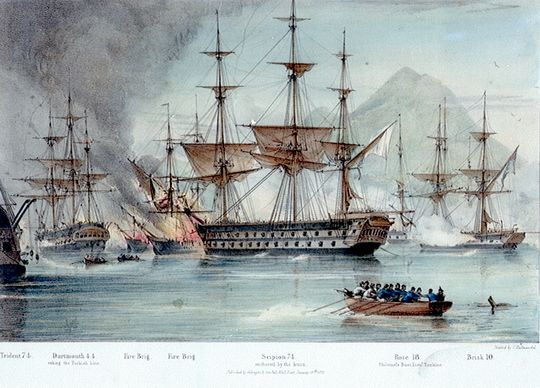
The Battle of Navarino on 20 October 1827; Scipion is shown in the centre, entangled with a fireship

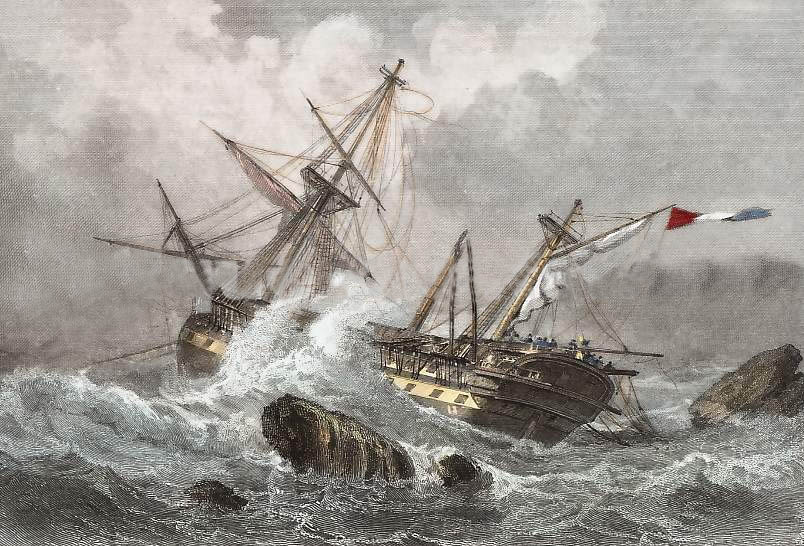
The wreck of Superbe at Paros on 15 December 1833

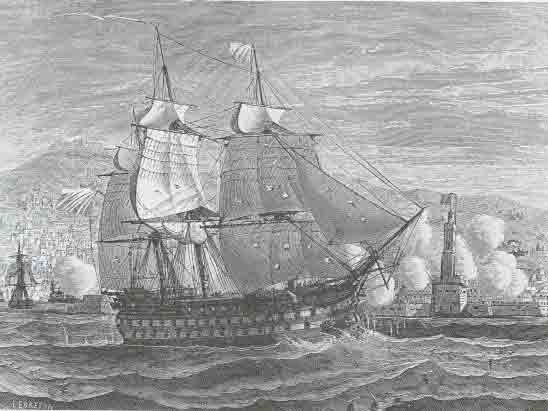
Hercule, by then renamed Provence, during the Invasion of Algiers in 1830, by Lebreton.

Pluton class – A revised design for Téméraire class, by Jacques-Noël Sané, described officially as "the small model" specially introduced to be constructed at shipyards outside France itself (the first pair were built at Toulon) where they lacked the depth of water required to launch 74s of the Téméraire class.

- Pluton 74 (launched 17 January 1805 at Toulon) – captured by the Spanish at Cadiz in June 1808, retained the same name, later renamed Montañes, BU 1816.
- Borée 74 (launched 27 June 1805 at Toulon) – BU 1827
- Génois 74 (launched 17 August 1805 at Genoa) – BU 1821
- Charlemagne 74 (launched 8 April 1807 at Antwerp) – Transferred to the Netherlands Navy in 1814 and renamed Nassau.
- Commerce de Lyon 74 (launched 9 April 1807 at Antwerp) – BU 1830
- Anversois 74 (launched 7 June 1807 at Antwerp) – BU 1819
- Duguesclin 74 (launched 20 June 1807 at Antwerp) – BU 1820
- César 74 (launched 21 June 1807 at Antwerp) – transferred to the Netherlands Navy on 1 August 1814 and renamed Prins Frederik.
- Dantzig 74 (launched 15 August 1807 at Antwerp) – renamed Achille in August 1814, BU 1816
- Ville de Berlin 74 (launched 6 September 1807 at Antwerp) – renamed Atlas in July 1815, BU 1819
- Pultusk 74 (launched 20 September 1807 at Antwerp) – Transferred to the Netherlands Navy on 1 August 1814 and renamed Waterloo.
- Breslaw 74 (launched 3 May 1808 at Genoa) – condemned 1836.
- Dalmate 74 (launched 21 August 1808 at Antwerp)
- Albanais 74 (launched 2 October 1808 at Antwerp)
- Rivoli 74 (launched 6 September 1810 at Venice) – captured by the British in an action in the Adriatic in February 1812 and added to the RN under the same name, stricken 1819.
- Mont Saint Bernard 74 (launched 9 June 1809 at Venice)
- Régénérateur 74 (launched July 1811 at Venice)
- Royal Hollandais 74 (begun 1806 at Flushing, frames taken to Woolwich after Flushing was taken by the British, and there launched as HMS Chatham on 14 February 1812)
- Castiglione 74 (launched 2 August 1812 at Venice)
- Royal Italien 74 (launched 15 August 1812 at Venice)
- Piet Hein 74 (launched 1 May 1813 at Rotterdam) – abandoned December 1813 to Netherlands, who renamed her Admiraal Piet Hein
- Couronne 74 (launched 26 October 1813 at Amsterdam) – abandoned December 1813 to Netherlands, who renamed her Prins Willem de Eerste
- Montebello 74 (launched 7 November 1815 at Venice) – completed by Austrians, who renamed her Cesare but never finished her
- Audacieux 74 (launched October 1816 at Amsterdam for Netherlands Navy, renamed Wassenaar)
- Polyphème 74 (launched July 1817 at Amsterdam for Netherlands Navy, renamed Holland)

Four further ships begun at Venice to this design were never launched – Montenotte, Arcole, Lombardo and Semmering; all were broken up on the stocks by the Austrian occupiers.

Pluton-class ships of the First Empire
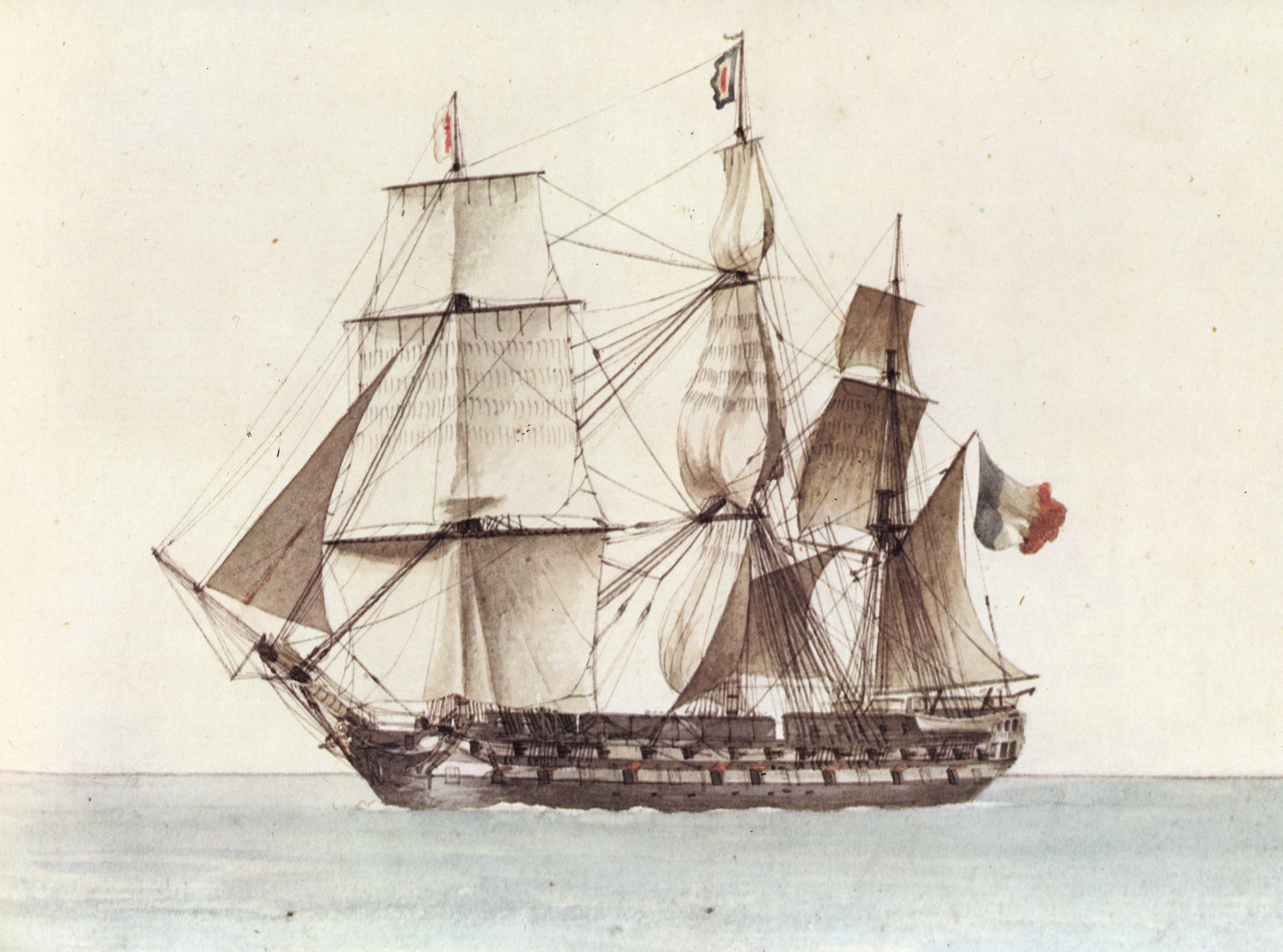
Portrait of Borée on 12 April 1807, by Antoine Roux

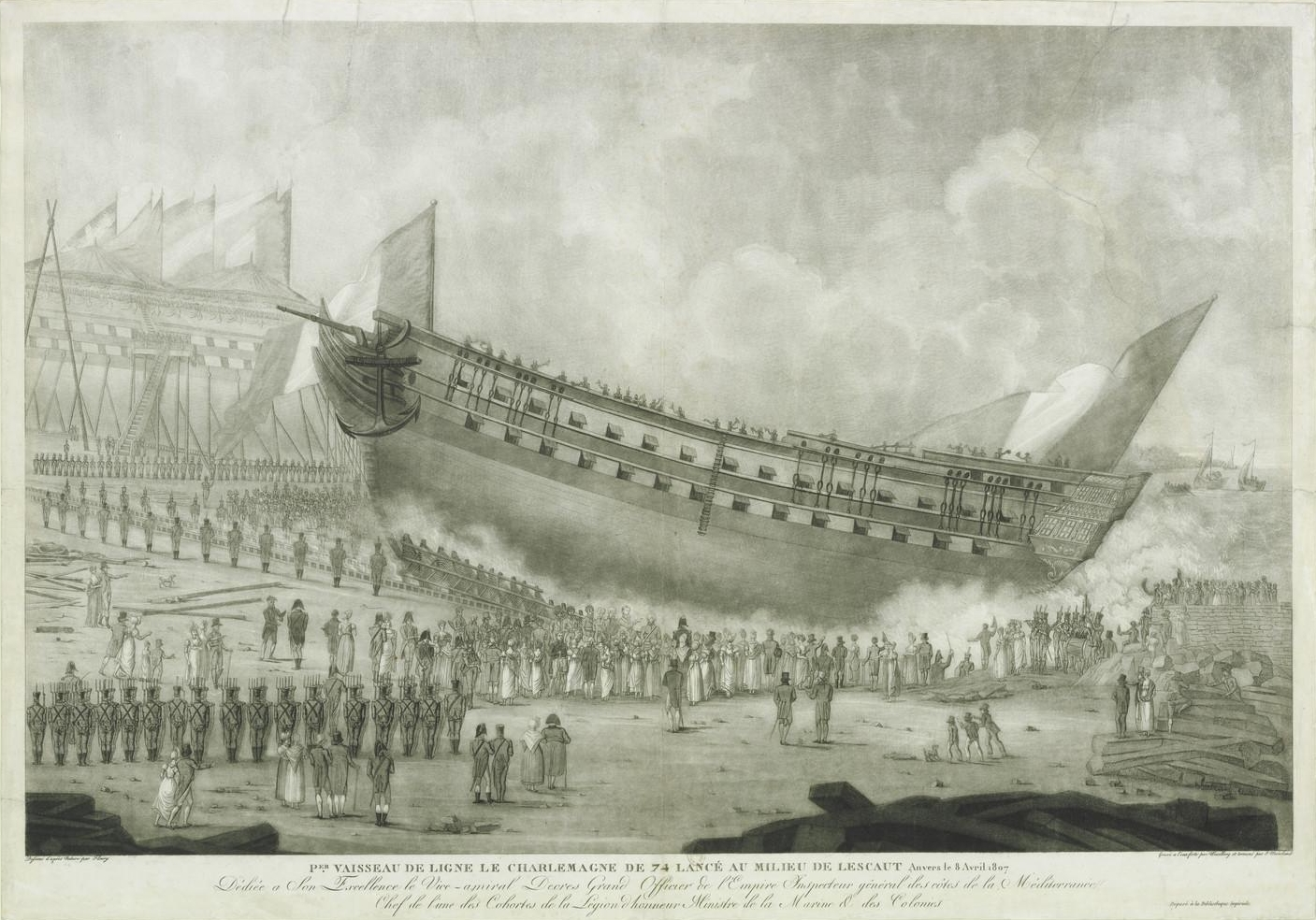
Launch of Charlemagne before Napoléon

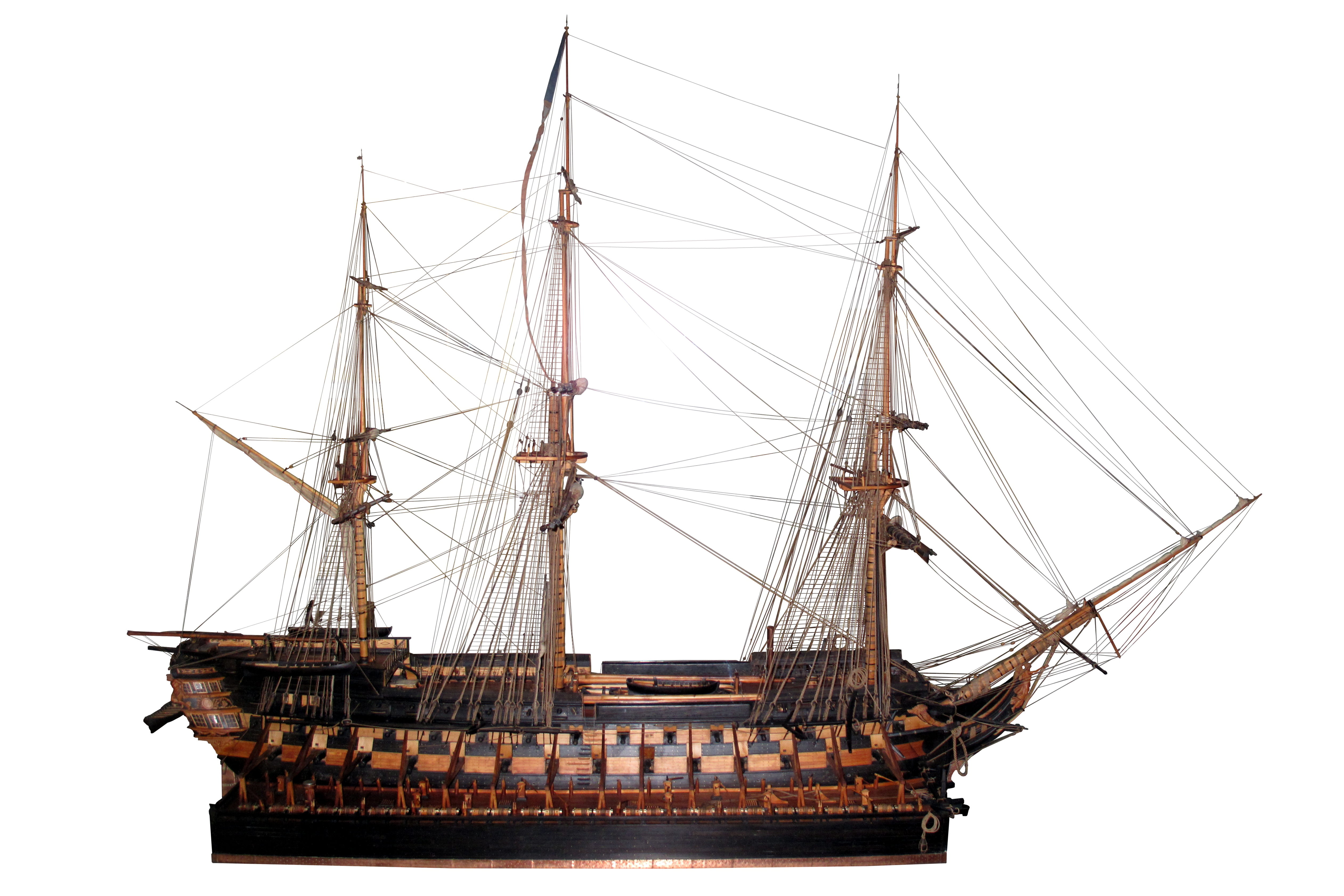
1/40th scale model of Rivoli fitted with seacamels.

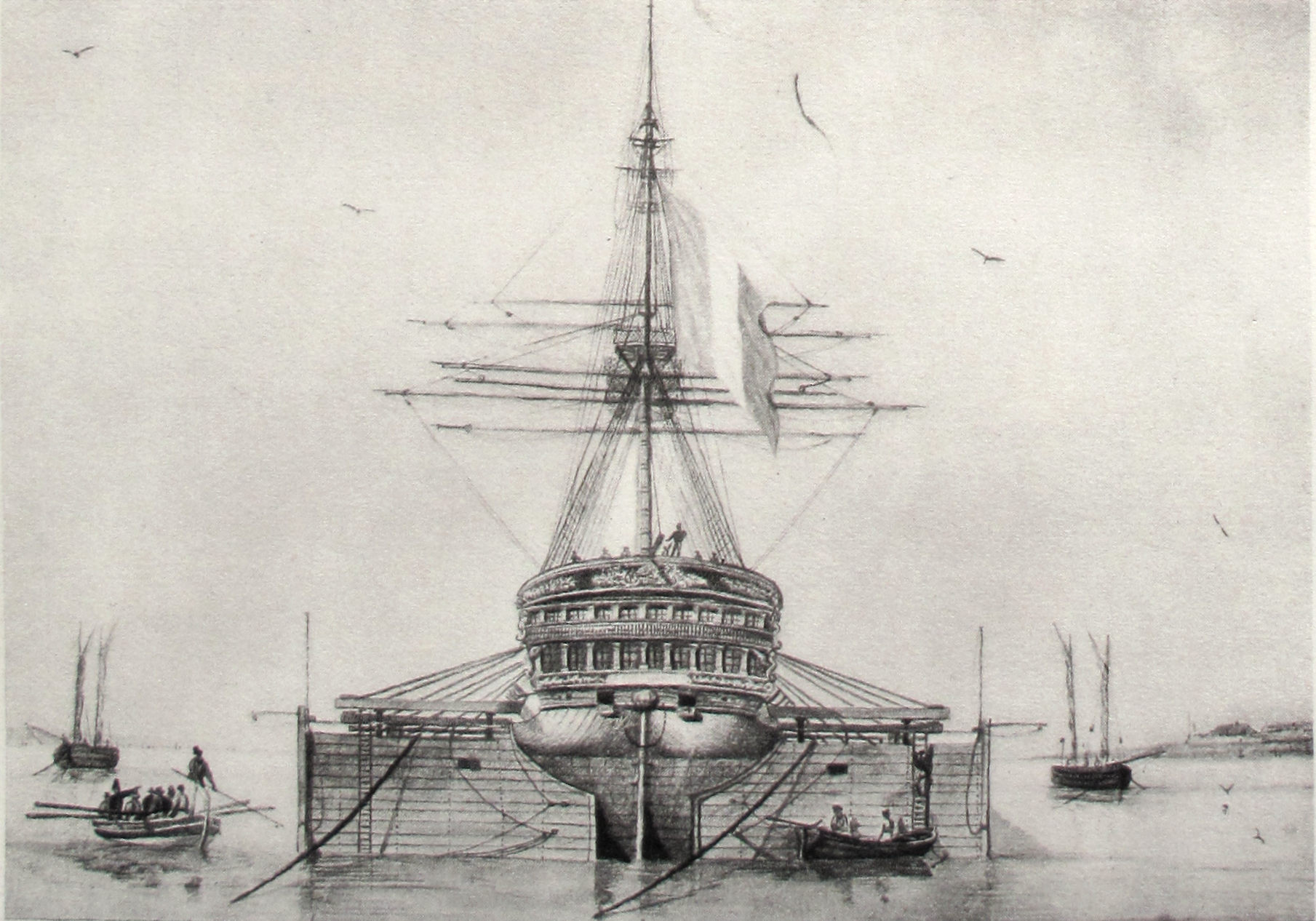
Mont Saint-Bernard fitted with Ship Camels

=== Captured or otherwise acquired from foreign navies 1805–1810 ===
- Calcutta 60 (British HMS Calcutta 56, built 1787–88 at Blackwall as mercantile Warley, captured September 1805) – burnt by the RN at Île d'Aix in April 1809.
- Argonaute 74 (Spanish Vencedor, built 1752–56 at Cadiz, exchanged there in October 1806 for French-built Argonaute) – captured June 1808 by the Spanish at Cadiz.
- Vasco de Gama 74 (Portuguese Dom Vasco de Gama, built 1788–93 at Lisbon, seized there November 1807) – retaken by the Portuguese in September 1808.
- Maria Primeira 74 (Portuguese Dona Maria Primera, built 1788–90 at Lisbon, seized there November 1807) – retaken by the Portuguese in September 1808.
- Notre Dame des Martyres 74 (Portuguese Nossa Senhora dos Martires, built 1806–07 at Lisbon, seized November 1807 on the stocks there) – retaken by the Portuguese in September 1808.
- Princesse de Beira 64 (Portuguese Princesa da Beira, built 1757–59 at Lisbon, seized there November 1807) – retaken by the Portuguese in September 1808.
- Saint Sébastien 64 (Portuguese São Sebastião, built 1764–67 at Lisbon, seized November 1807) – retaken by the Portuguese in September 1808.
- Paraskevia 74 (Russian Paraskevia, built 1798–1800 at Kherson, ceded to France at Trieste 1809) – taken to pieces at Trieste 1810.
- Asie 64 (Russian Azia, built 1794–1797 at Archangel, ceded to France at Trieste 1809) – taken to pieces at Trieste 1810.
- Moscou 74 (Russian Moskva, built 1798–1800 at Archangel, purchased by France October 1809) – hulked 1810.
- Saint Pierre 74 (Russian Sviatoi Petr, built 1798–1800 at Archangel, purchased by France October 1809) – renamed Duquesne in February 1811; taken to pieces 1830.
- Kroonprins 80 (Netherlands Koninklijke Hollander, built 1797–99 at Amsterdam, seized July 1810) – restored to the Netherlands in May 1814.
- Amiral Zoutman 80 (Netherlands Amiraal Zoutman, built 1798–1801 at Amsterdam-Dorsm, seized July 1810) – restored to the Netherlands in May 1814.
- Commerce d'Amsterdam 80 (Netherlands Amsterdamsche Handel, built 1804–11 at Amsterdam-Dorsm, seized July 1810) – restored to the Netherlands in May 1814.
- Amiral de Ruyter 80 (Netherlands Admiraal de Ruyter, built 1806–11 at Amsterdam-Schuyt, seized July 1810) – restored to the Netherlands in May 1814.
- Amiral Evertsen 80 (Netherlands Admiraal Evertsen, built 1806–11 at Amsterdam-Schuyt, seized July 1810) – restored to the Netherlands in May 1814.
- Amiral Piet Hein 80 (Netherlands Admiraal Piet Hein, built 1806–10 at Rotterdam-Hetafzeb, seized July 1810) – never launched, demolished on the stocks.
- Brabant 74 (Netherlands Braband 68, built 1782–86 at Rotterdam-Hellevoetluys, seized July 1810) – restored to the Netherlands in May 1814.
- Utrech 64 (Netherlands Pieter Paulus 68, built 1798–1801 at Rotterdam-Glavim, seized July 1810) – restored to the Netherlands 1813.
- Dogger Bank 64 (Netherlands Dogger Bank 68, built 1797–1798 at Rotterdam-Glavim, seized July 1810) – returned to the Netherlands May 1814.
- Jean de Witt 64 (Netherlands Johan de Witt 68, built 1798–1799 at Rotterdam-Glavim, seized July 1810) – returned to the Netherlands May 1814.
- Commerce de Rotterdam 64 (Netherlands Rotterdam Handel 68, built 1798–1799 at Amsterdam-Dorsm, seized July 1810) – renamed Rotterdam in November 1813; returned to the Netherlands May 1814.

== Restored French Monarchy (1815–1848) ==
The Bourbon dynasty was restored (following Napoleon's "Hundred Days") under Louis XVIII in June 1815. He died 16 September 1824 and was succeeded by his brother Charles X who abdicated on 2 August 1830. Louis Philippe I reigned from 9 August 1830 until overthrown on 24 February 1848. The Second French Republic was established briefly from 1848 (until 1852).
This section of the article includes all ships of the line launched from July 1815 to February 1848.

=== 118-gun ships ("vaisseaux de 118") of the Restoration ===
Later Dauphin Royal class (continued) Later units of the 118-gun type, begun during the First Empire, were completed at various dates over the next few decades.

- Souverain 118 (launched 25 August 1819 at Toulon) – broken up 1905.
- Trocadéro 118 (launched 14 November 1824 at Toulon) – burnt by accident 1836.
- Friedland 114 (launched 4 April 1840 at Cherbourg) – Laid down in May 1812 as Inflexible, renamed Duc de Bordeaux in May 1821, renamed Friedland in August 1830. Hulked and renamed Colosse in 1865, BU 1879.
118-gun ships of the Restoration
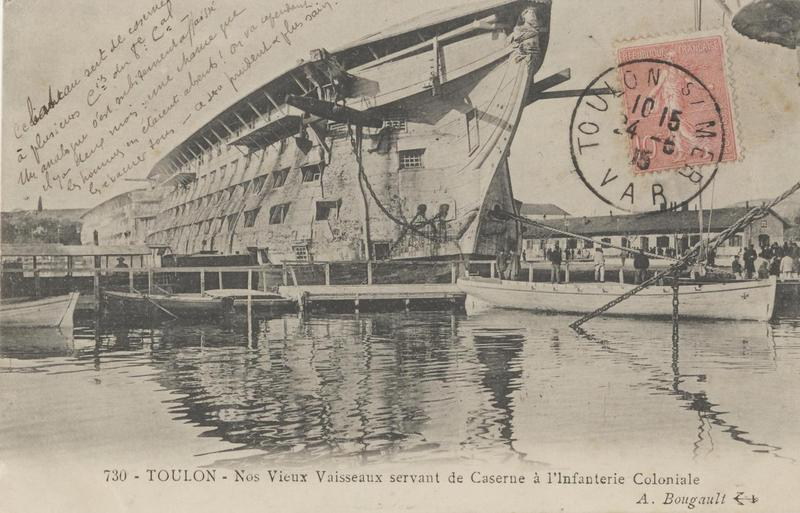
Souverain as a colonial infantry barracks in Toulon harbour around 1877

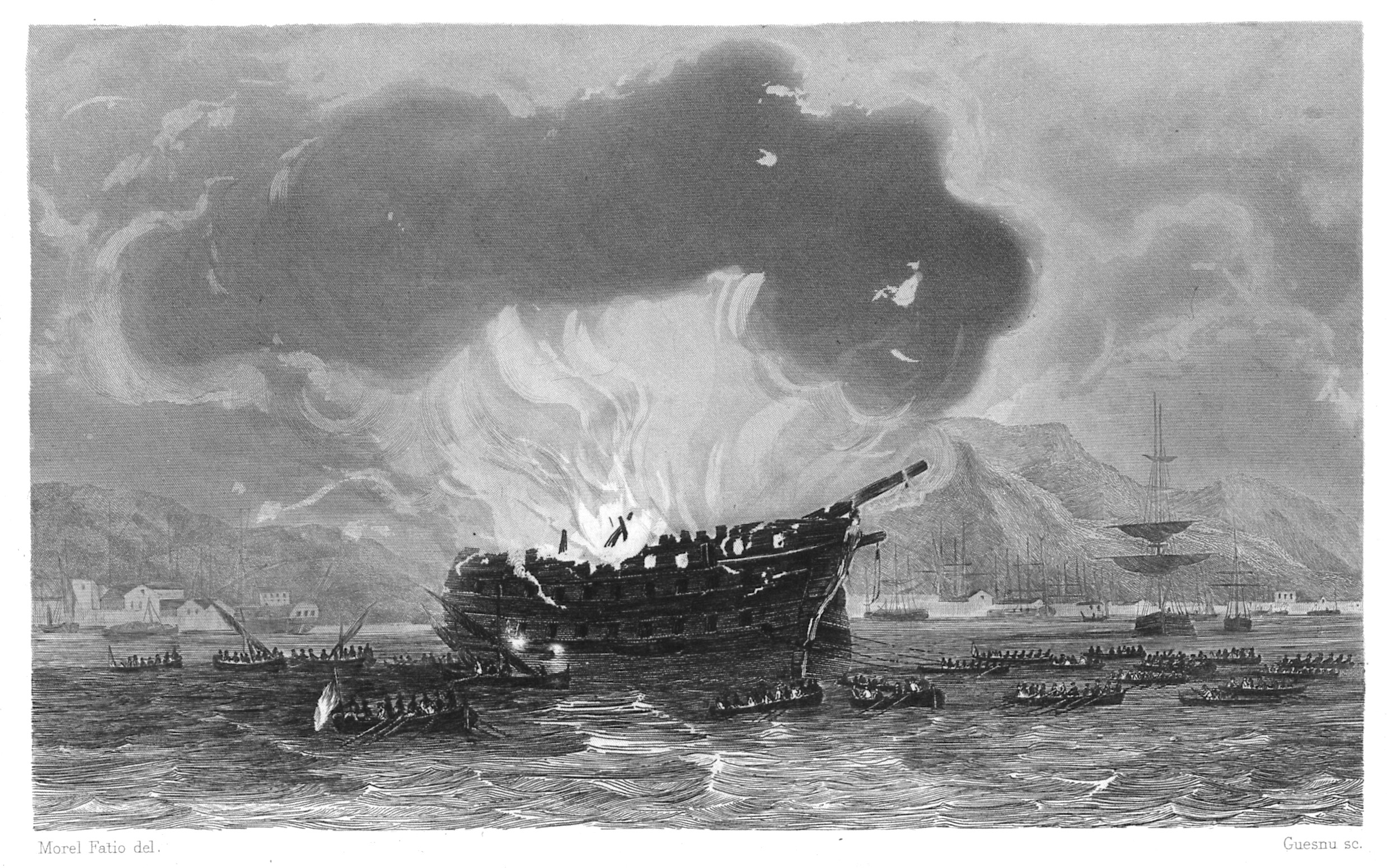
Explosion of Trocadéro. Drawing by Antoine Morel-Fatio.

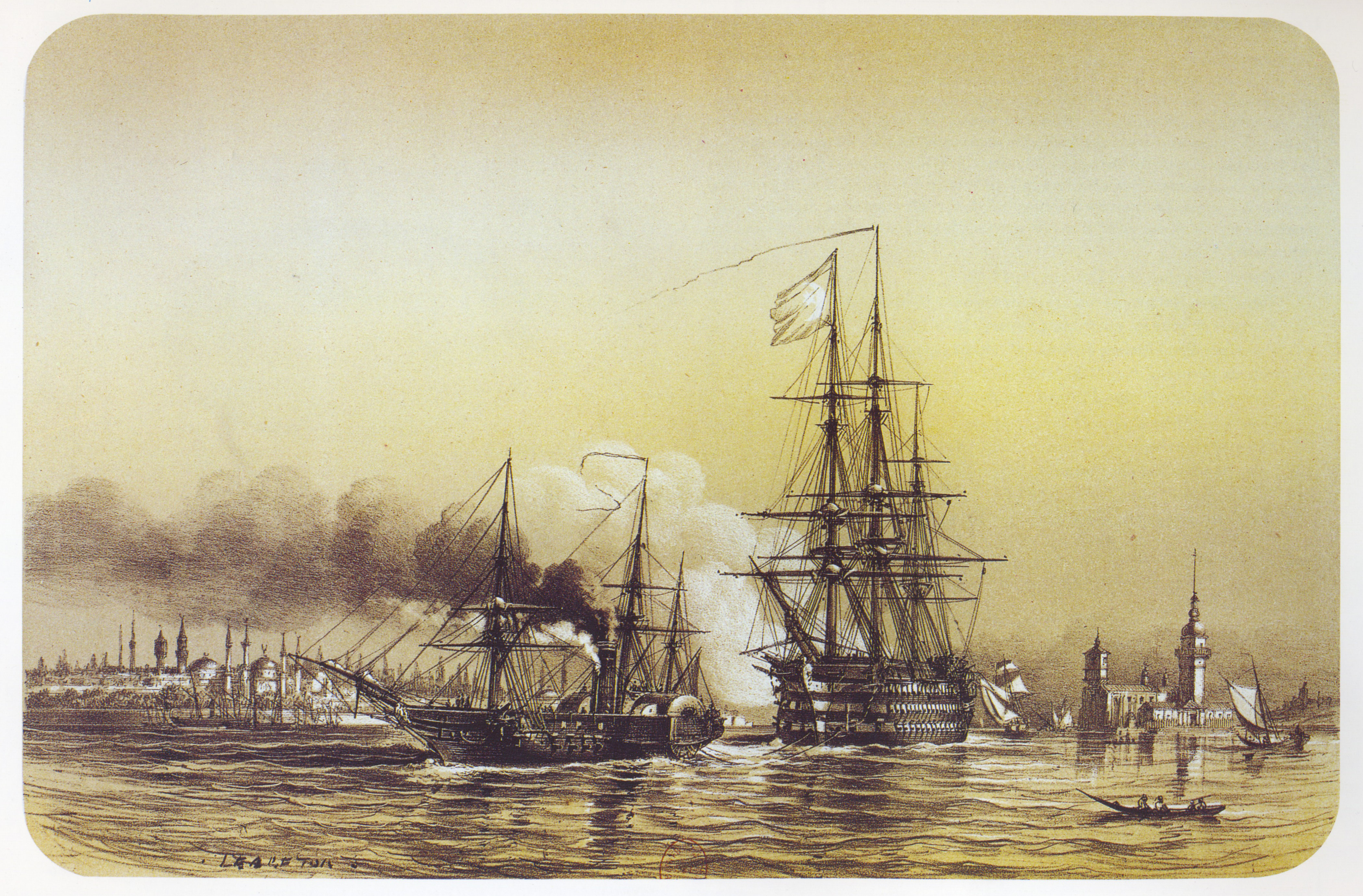
Friedland in tow of a steamer near Constantinople

=== 80-gun ships ("vaisseaux de 80") of the Restoration ===
Bucentaure class (continued)

- Centaure 80 (launched 8 January 1818 at Cherbourg) – renamed Santi Pietri in October 1823; 86 guns from 1837; hulked 1849, burnt by accident 1862.
- Neptune 80 (launched 21 March 1818 at Lorient) – 86-guns from 1837; hulked 1858, broken up 1868.
- Algésiras 80 (launched 21 August 1823 at Lorient) – 86 guns from 1837; deleted 1846.
- Jupiter 80 (launched 22 October 1831 at Cherbourg) – 86 guns from 1837; deleted 1863.
80-gun ships of the Restoration
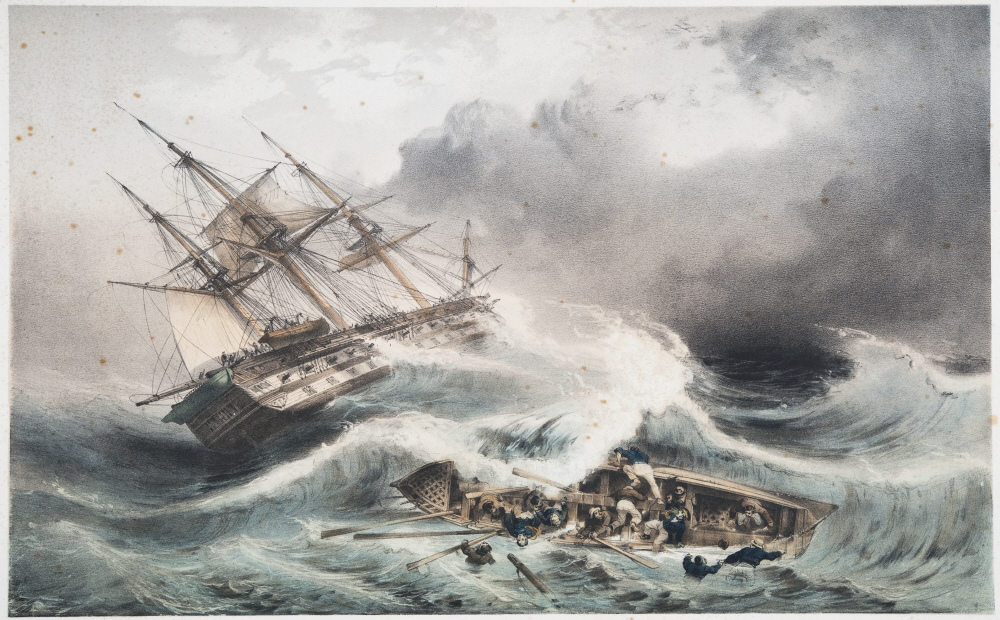
Loss of a longboat of Algésiras in a storm, 9 August 1831.

=== 74-gun ships ("vaisseaux de 74") of the Restoration ===
Téméraire class (continued)

- Duc de Berry 74 (launched 18 June 1818 at Rochefort) – – raséed 1832–34 at Brest, becoming 1st Class 58-gun frigate, renamed Minerve in January 1832, hulked 1853, renamed Aber Wrach in July 1865; broken up 1874.
- Jean Bart 74 (launched 25 August 1820 at Lorient-Caudan) – hulked 1833, broken up after 1835.
- Triton 74 (launched 22 September 1823 at Rochefort) – 80 guns from 1837; hulked 1850–52, broken up 1870.
- Couronne 74 (launched 26 August 1824 at Brest) – 80 guns from 1837, later renamed Duperré; hulked 1862, broken up 1870.
- Généreux 74 (launched 23 September 1831 at Cherbourg) – 80 guns from 1837; hulked 1851, taken to pieces 1865.
74-gun ships of the Restoration
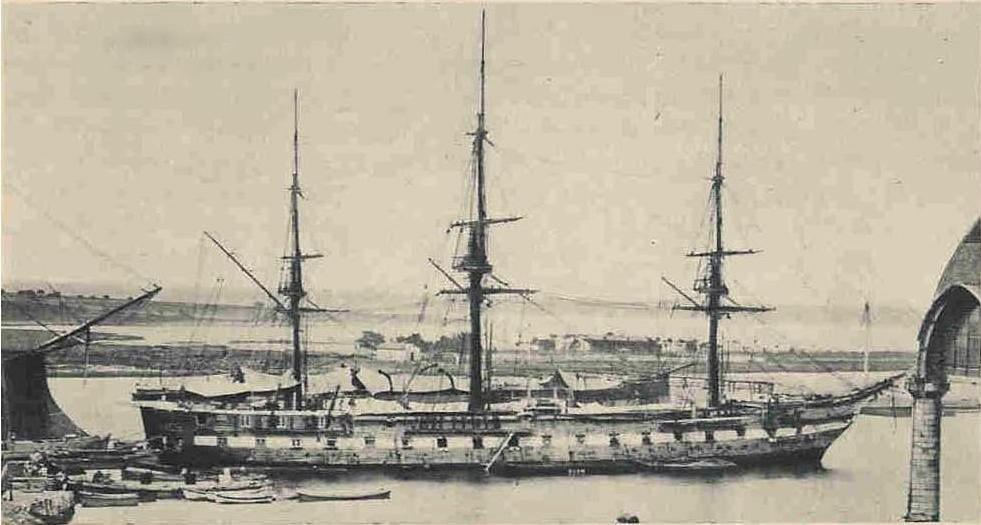
Duc de Berry razeed into the frigate Minerve

=== 90-gun ships ("vaisseaux de 90") of the Restoration ===
Suffren class, of the Commission de Paris

- Suffren 90 (launched 27 August 1829 at Cherbourg)
- Inflexible 90 (launched 21 November 1839 at Rochefort)
90-gun ships of the Restoration
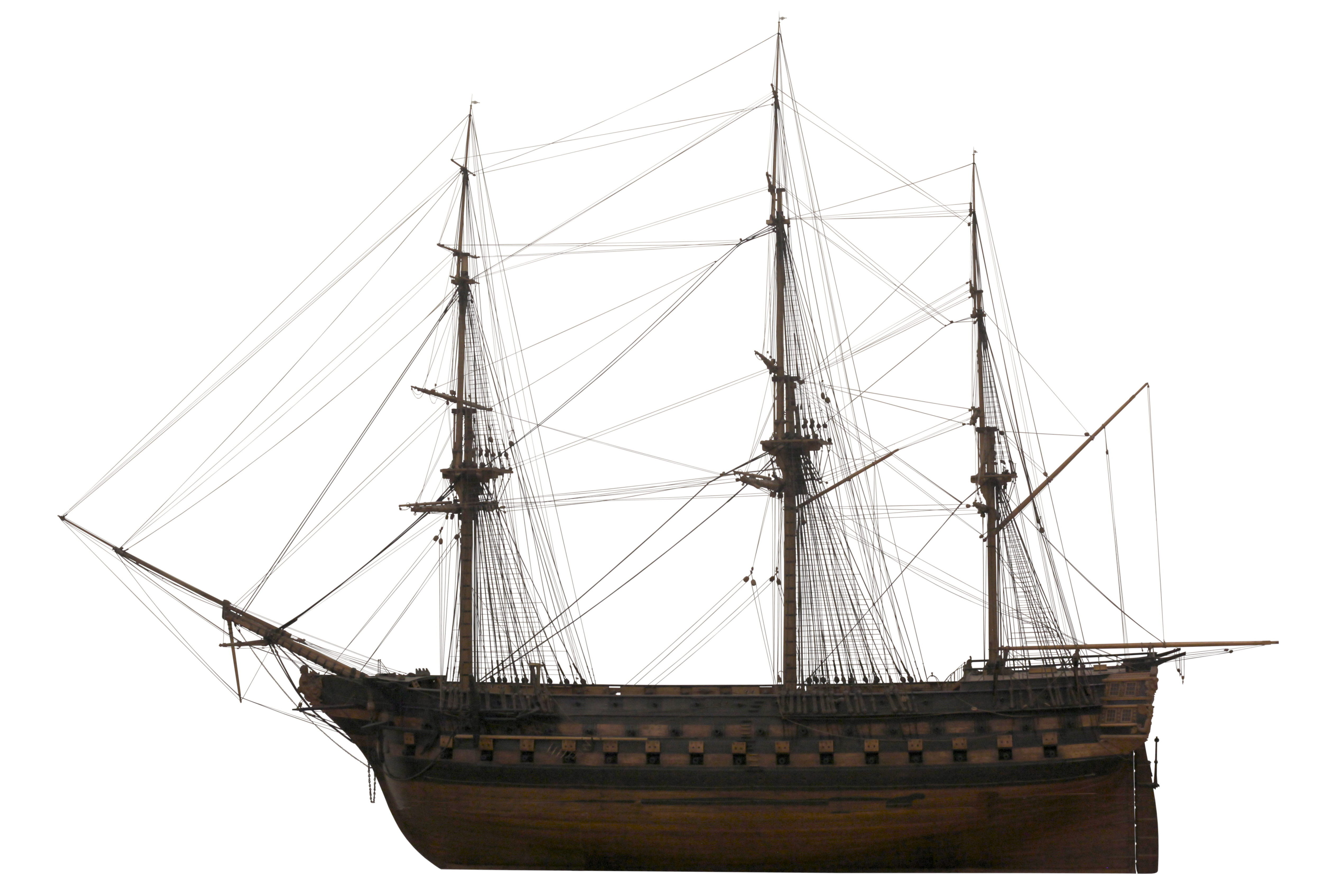
1/20th scale model of Suffren, on display at the Musée national de la Marine

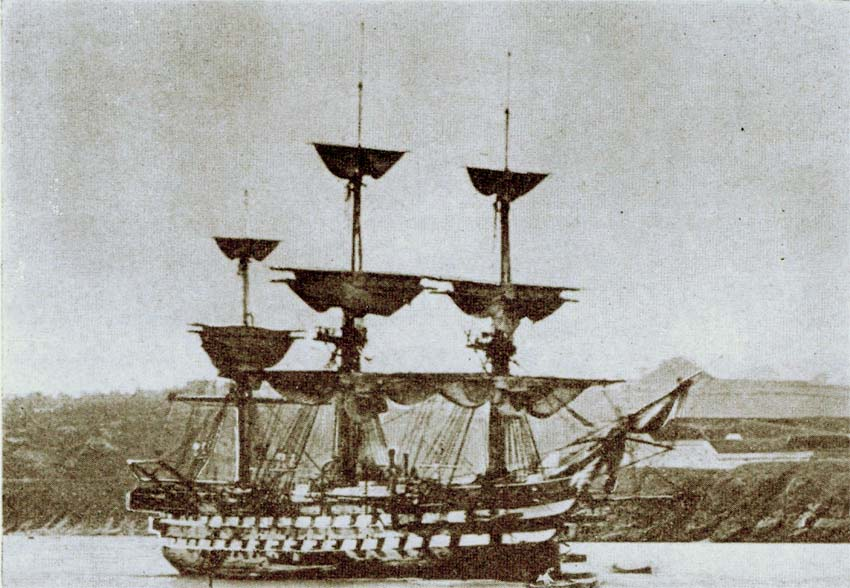
Inflexible as a boys' school, photographed after 1860

=== 100-gun ships ("vaisseaux de 100") of the Restoration ===
Hercule class, of the Commission de Paris

- Hercule 100 (launched 29 July 1836 at Toulon)
- Tage 100 (launched 15 August 1847 at Brest)
- Henri IV 100 (launched 14 September 1848 at Cherbourg)
- Jemmapes 100 (launched 2 April 1840 at Lorient)
- Lys 100 originally (1821), renamed Ulm and commissioned as an 82-gun, steam-powered ship.
100-gun ships of the Restoration
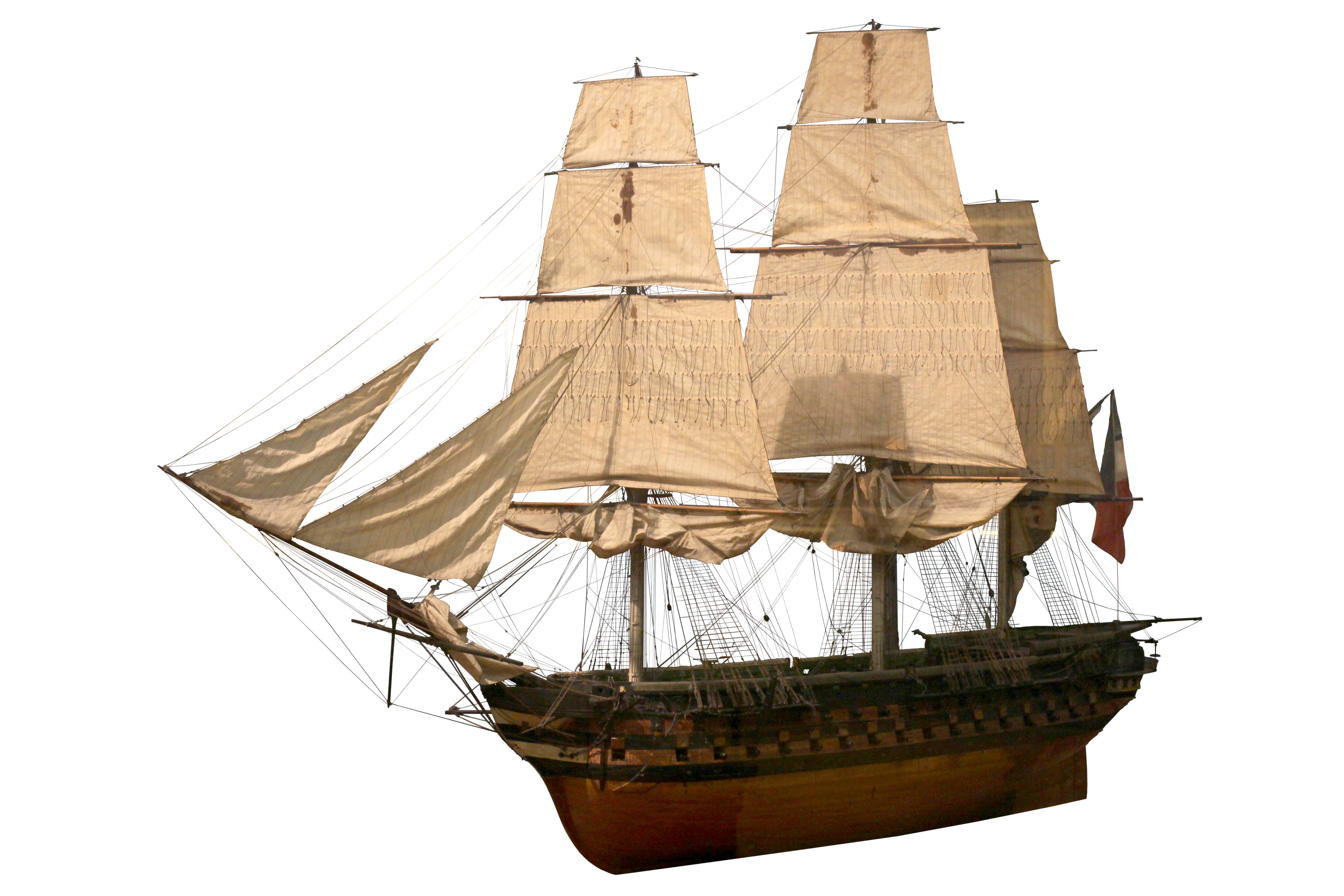
1/40th-scale model of the 100-gun Hercule on display at the Musée national de la Marine.

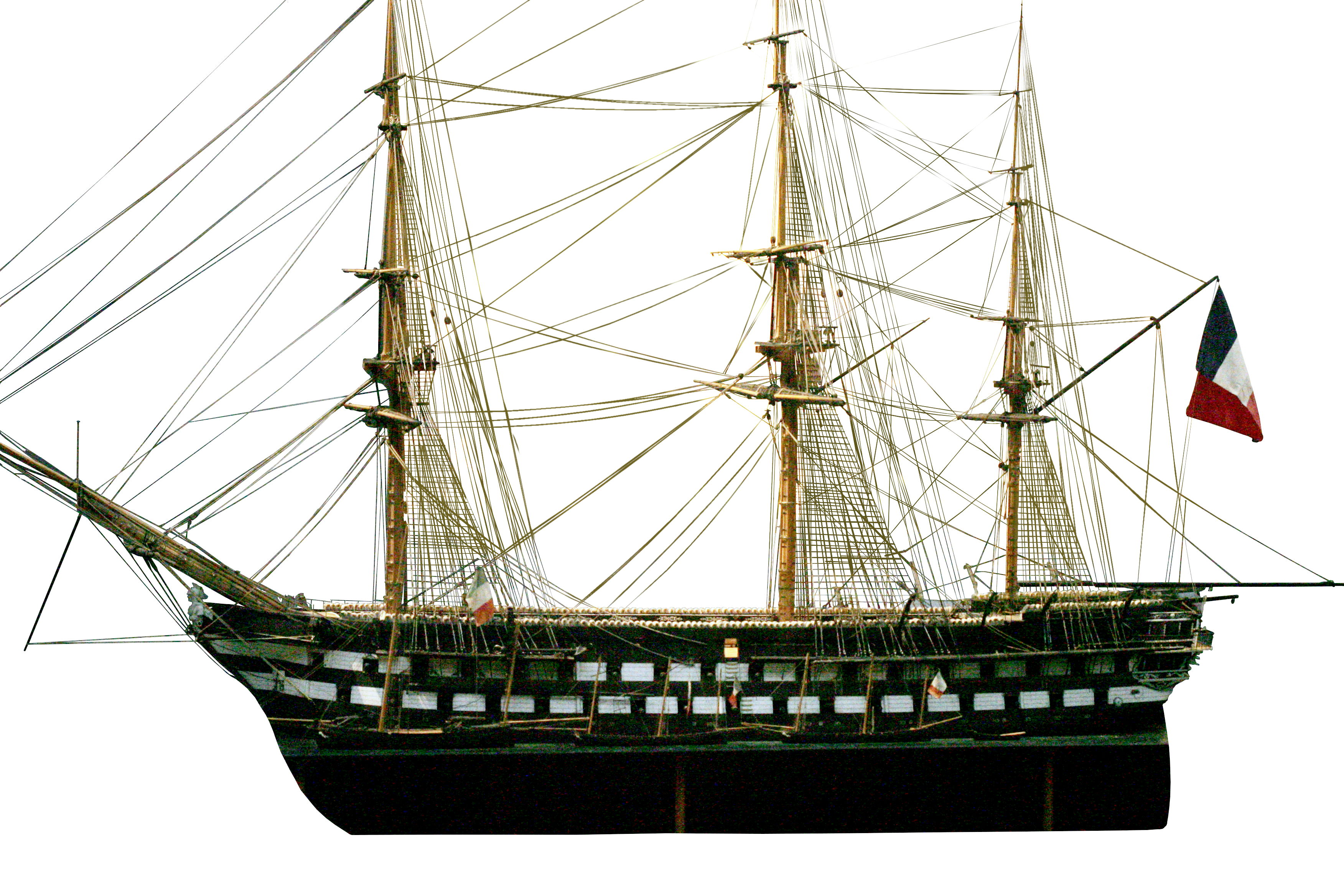
Scale model of Tage on display at the Musée National de la Marine in Paris

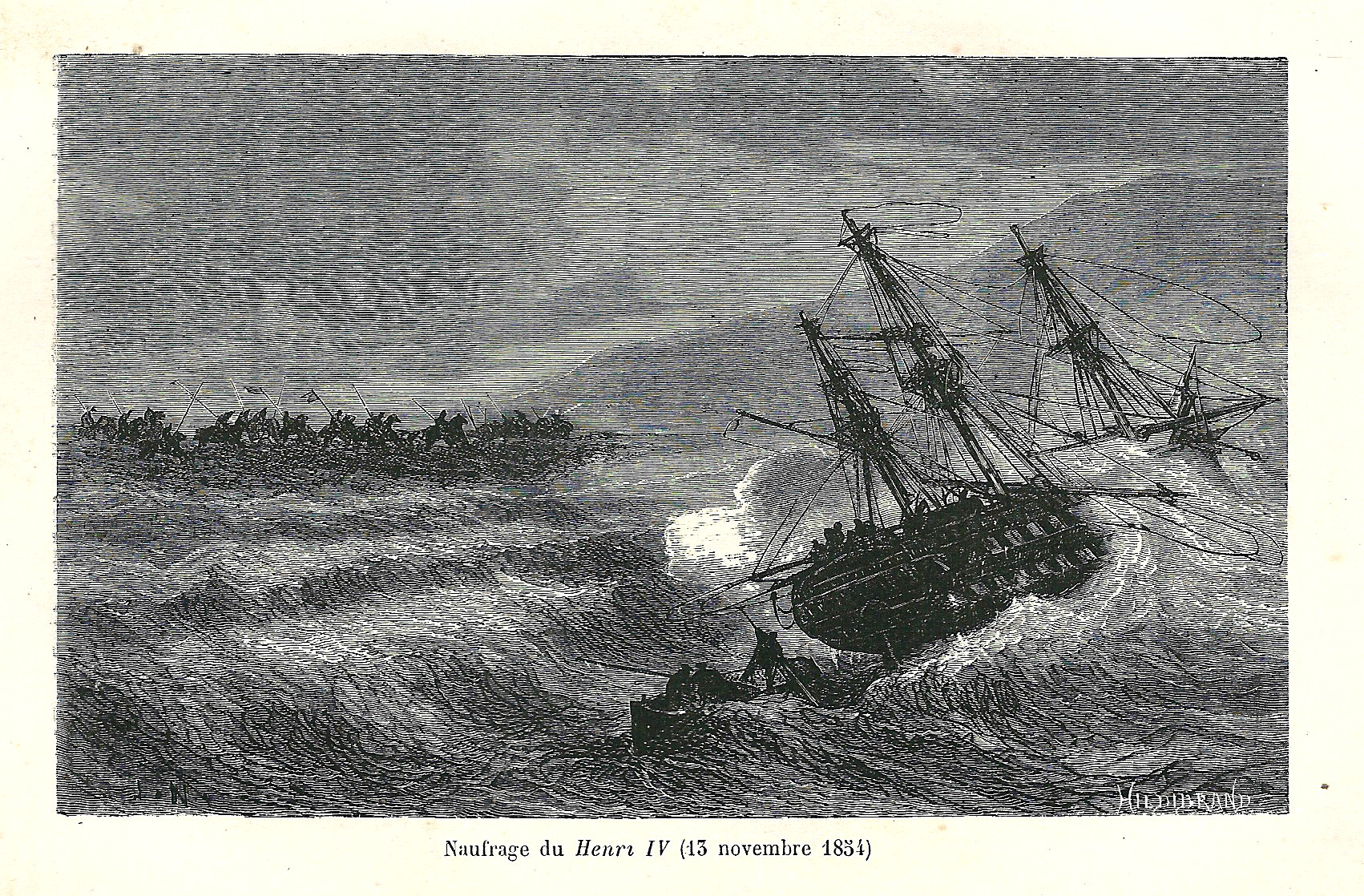
Loss of Henri IV

=== 120-gun ship of the Restoration ===
- Valmy 120 (1847), only capital ship built to the specifications of the Commission de Paris
Other ships of the Restoration
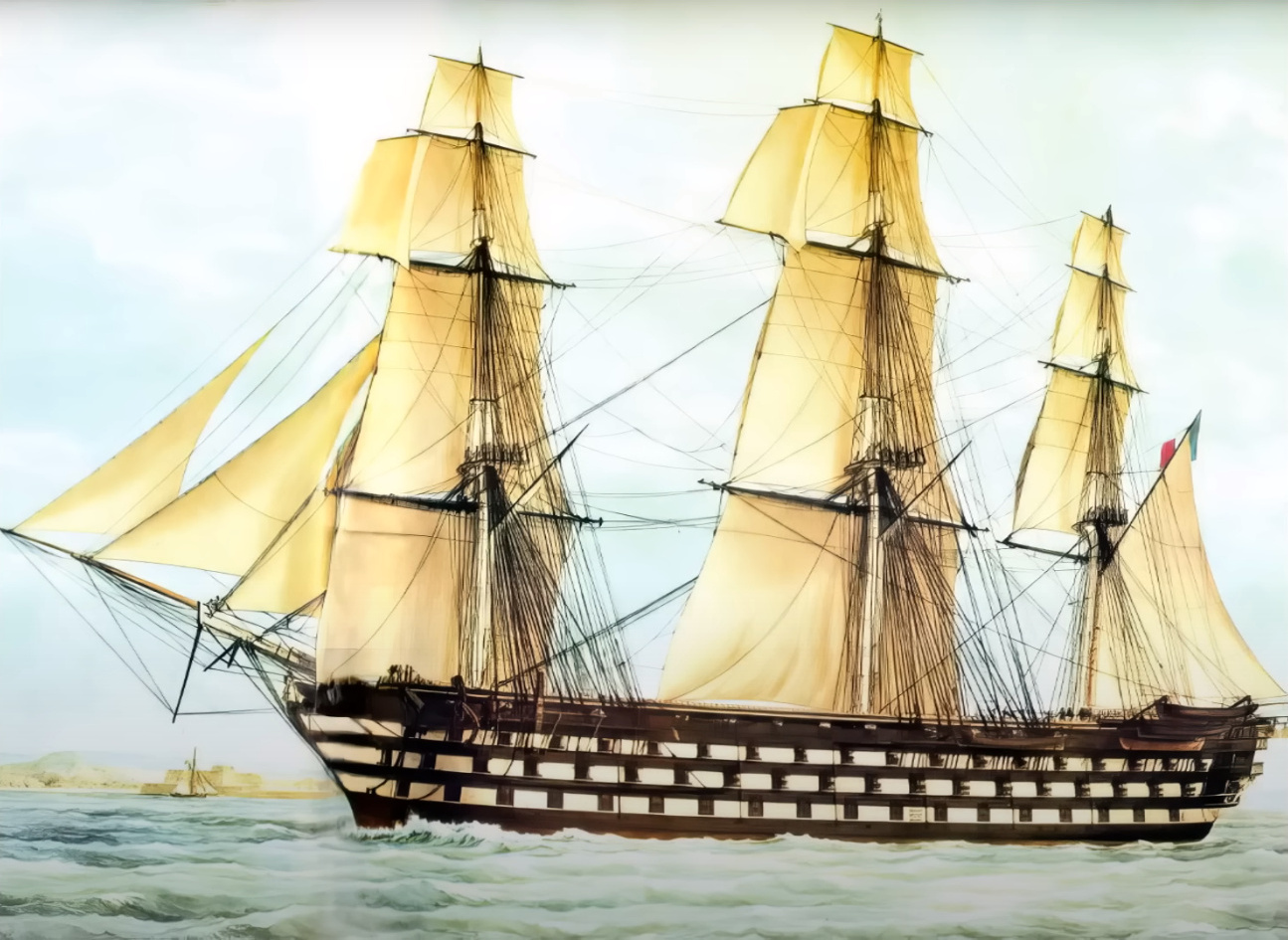
Valmy

== Second Republic (1848 to 1852) and Second Empire (1852 to 1870) ==
Prince Louis-Napoleon Bonaparte (the nephew of Napoleon I) became president in December 1848 following the abdication in February 1848 of Louis Philippe I; he subsequently became Emperor Napoléon III on 2 December 1852 and ruled until he was deposed and the Third Republic was proclaimed on 4 September 1870.

=== Océan-class ships of the line ===
Two further units of the Océan class were built to an altered design, with a thumblehome reduced by 20 centimetres, increasing space available on the upper decks. The design later inspired an aborted Bretagne class which, furthered altered to incorporate the "swift battleship" concept of the Napoléon class, would yield the 130-gun Bretagne, the ultimate wooden capital ship of the French Navy.

- Ville de Paris 114 (launched 5 October 1850 at Rochefort) – Laid down as Marengo, renamed Ville de Vienne 1814, renamed Comte d'Artois 1830. Rebuilt 1858, stricken 1882, BU 1898
- Louis XIV 114 (launched 28 February 1854 at Rochefort) – Laid down in April 1811 as Tonnant, renamed Louis XIV in December 1828. Stricken 1880, BU 1882
118-gun ships of the Second Republic and Second Empire
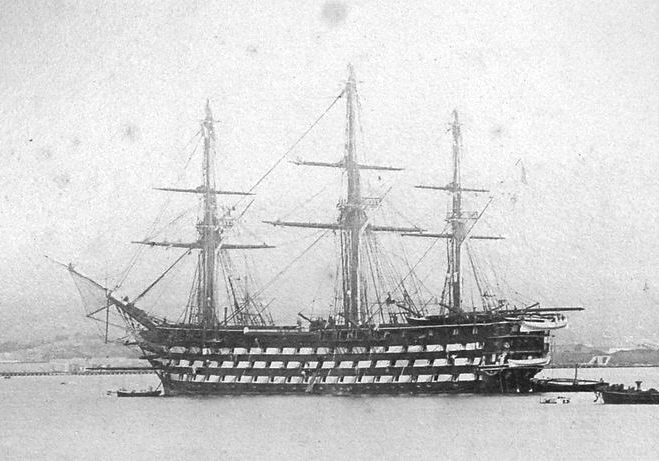
Photograph of Ville de Paris, circa 1854

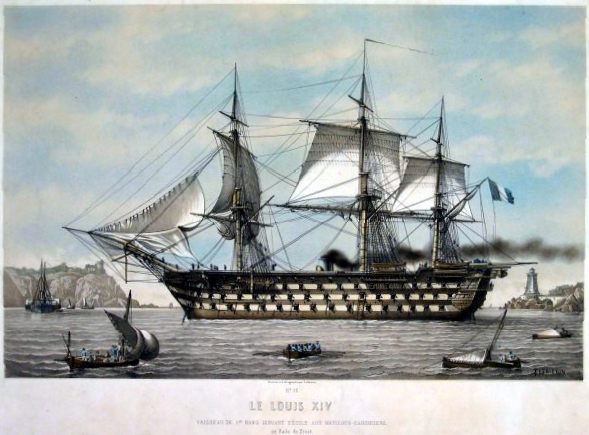
Engraving by Louis Lebreton showing Louis XIV as a naval school

=== Hercule-class ships of the line (further ships of this class) ===
The ships of the Hercule class, designed to be 100-gun sailing ships of the line, were modified and transformed into 90-gun steam ships of the line

- Tage 90 (launched 15 April 1847 at Brest) – Transport 1875
- Austerlitz 90 (launched 15 September 1852 at Cherbourg) – Stricken 1872
- Fleurus 90 (launched 2 December 1853 at Toulon) – Stricken 1869
- Prince Jérôme 90 (launched 2 December 1853 at Lorient) – Transport 1872
- Duguay-Trouin 90 (launched 29 March 1854 at Lorient) – Stricken 1872
- Turenne 90 (launched 15 April 1854 at Rochefort) – Stricken 1867
- Ulm 90 (launched 13 May 1854 at Rochefort) – Hulk 1867
- Wagram 90 (launched 19 June 1854 at Lorient) – Stricken 1867
- Navarin 90 (launched 26 July 1854 at Toulon) – Transport 1873
- Eylau 90 (launched 15 May 1856 at Toulon) – Stricken 1877
118-gun ships of the Second Republic and Second Empire
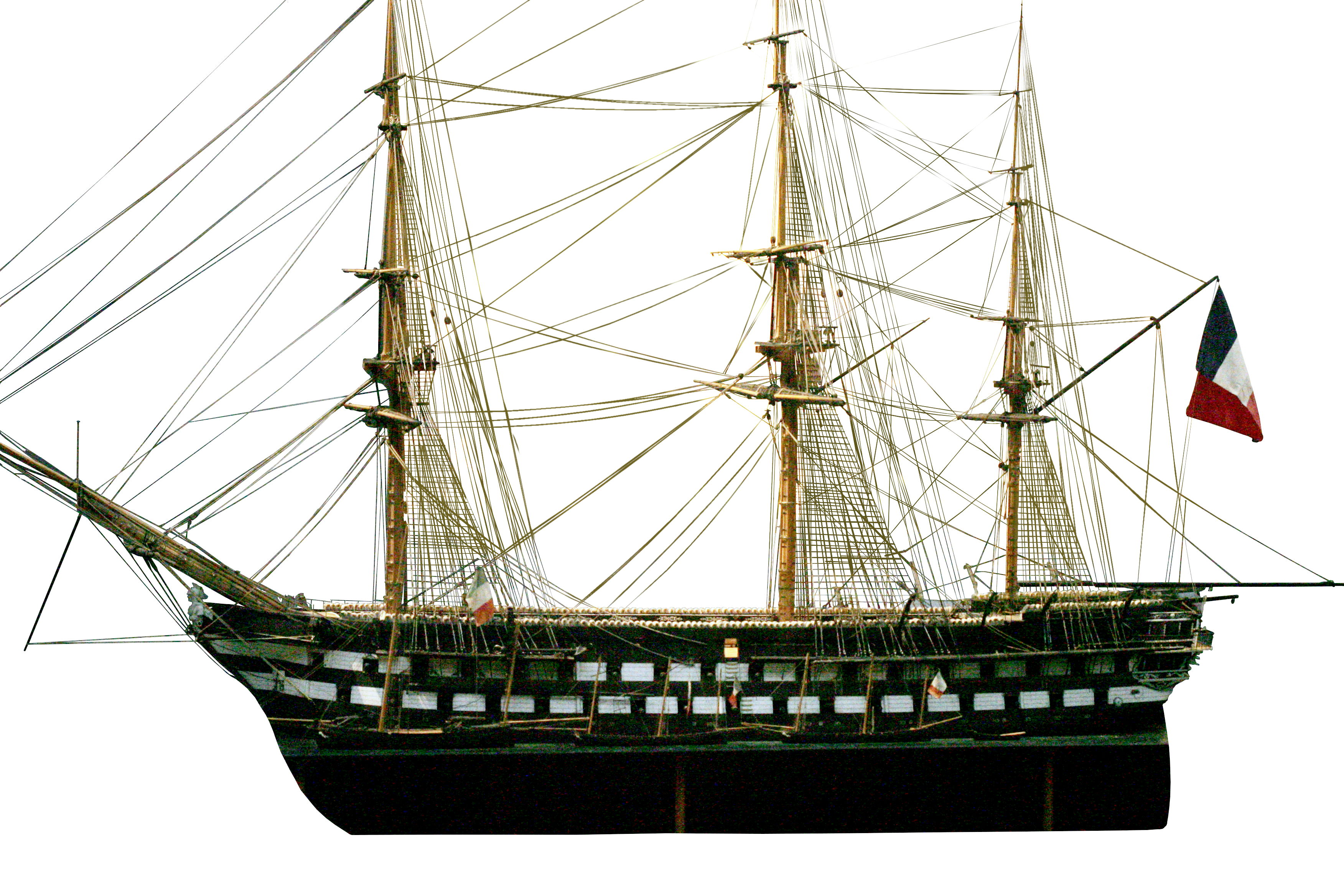
Scale model of Tage on display at the Musée National de la Marine in Paris

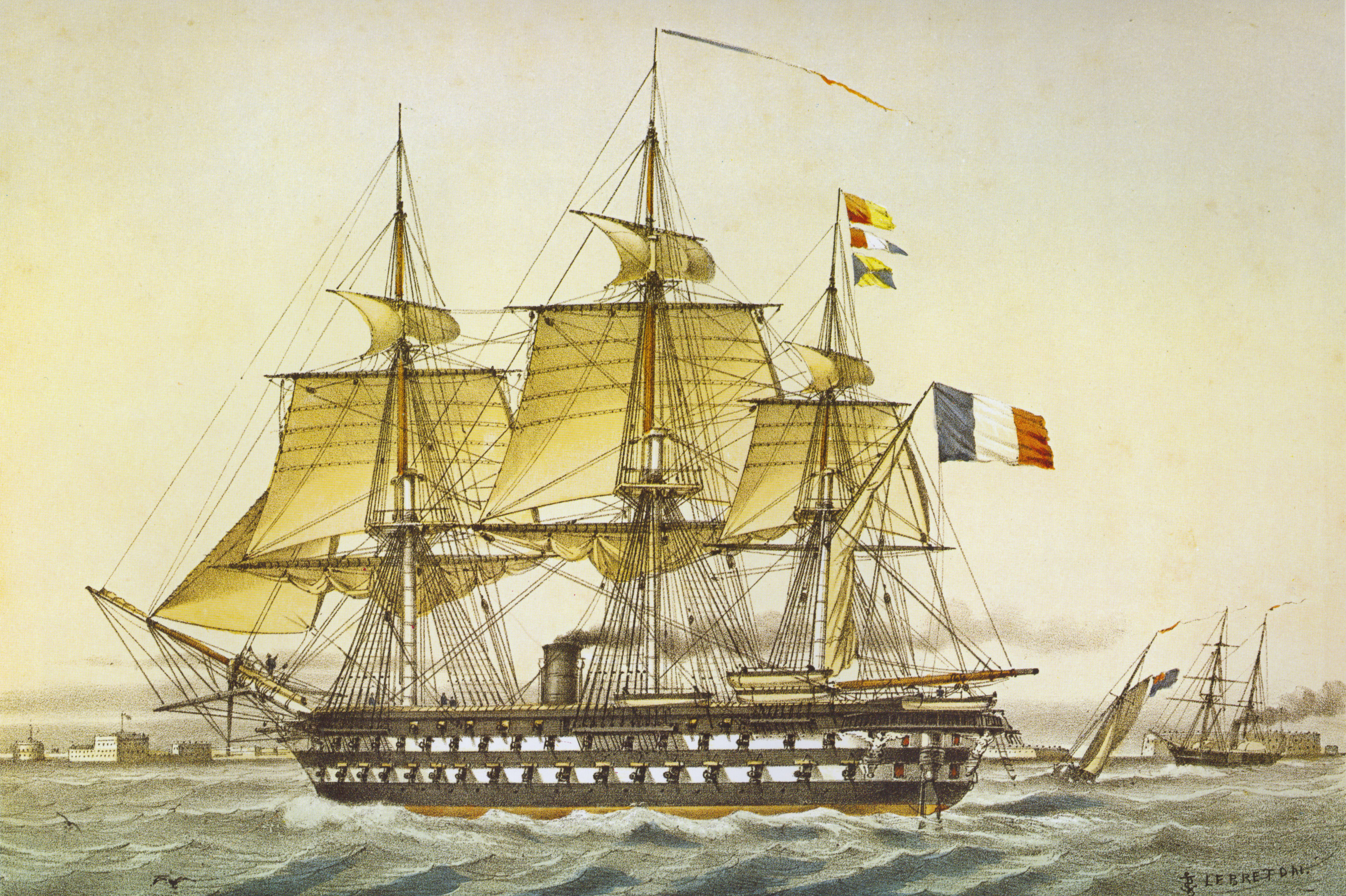
Austerlitz in 1854, drawing by Louis Le Breton

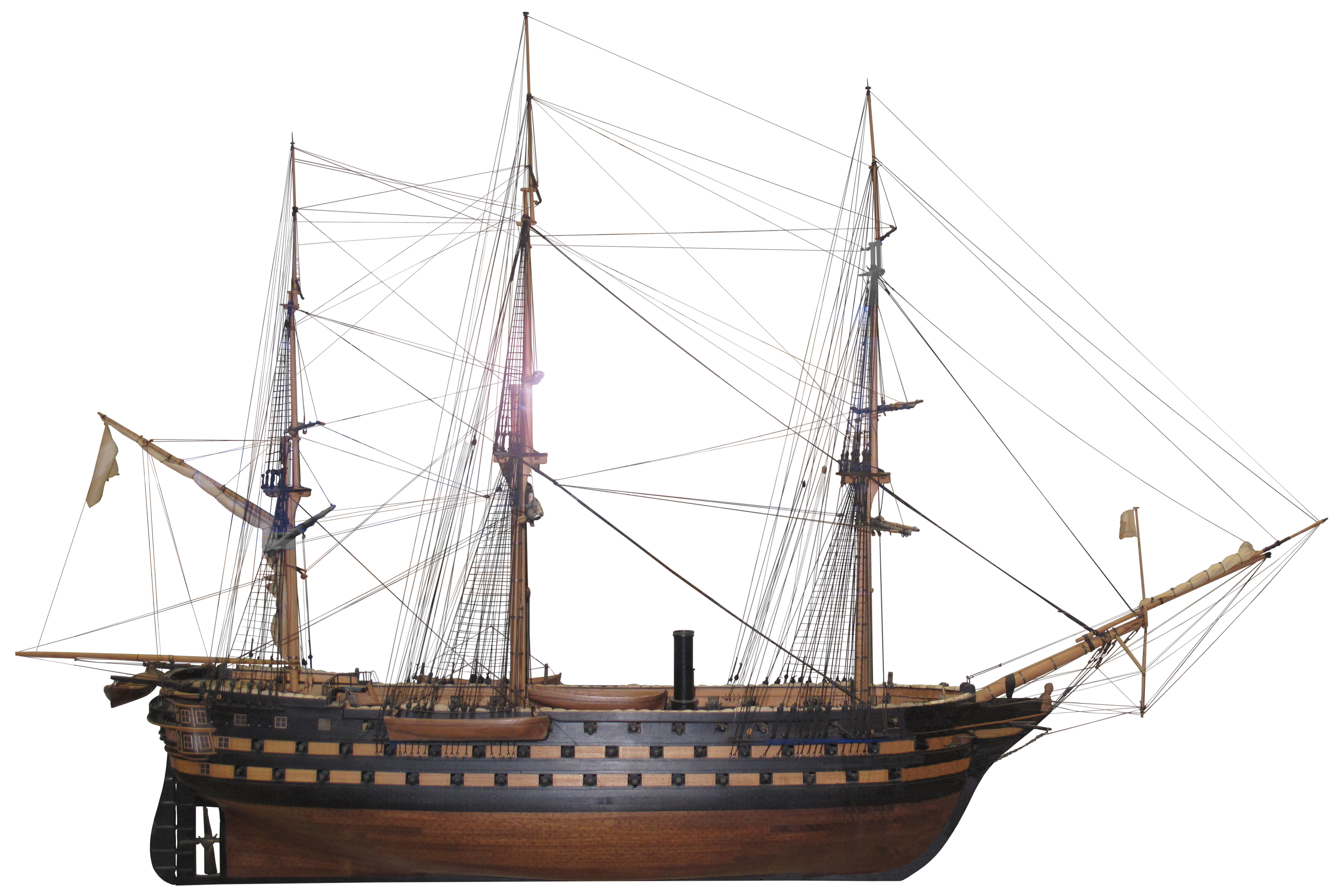
1/75-scale model of Prince Jérôme, on display at the Swiss Museum of Transport

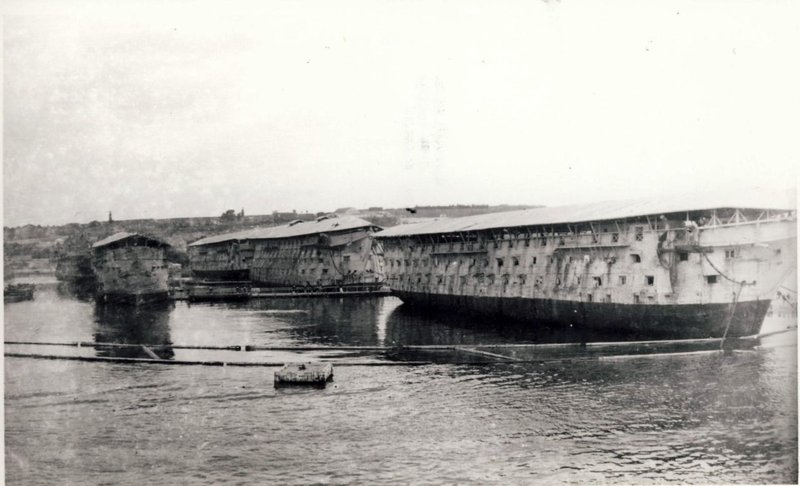
Photograph of Eylau as a hulk in Toulon (foreground)

=== Suffren-class ships of the line (further ships of this class) ===
The ships of the Suffren class, designed to be 90-gun sailing ships of the line, were modified and transformed into 80-gun steam ships of the line

- Donawerth 80 (launched 15 February 1854 at Lorient) – Stricken 1872
- Tilsitt 80 (launched 30 March 1854 at Cherbourg) – Stricken 1872
- Saint Louis 80 (launched 25 April 1854 at Brest) – Training ship 1881
- Jean Bart 80 (launched 14 September 1852 at Lorient) – renamed Donawerth 1868 – Stricken 1880
- Bayard 80 (launched 28 August 1848 at Lorient) – Stricken 1872
- Duguesclin 80 (launched 3 May 1848 at Rochefort) – wrecked 1859
- Breslaw 80 (launched 31 July 1848 at Brest) – Stricken 1872
- Charlemagne 80 (launched 16 January 1851 at Toulon) – Transport 1867
- Alexandre 90 (launched 1857 at Rochefort) – Stricken 1877
- Fontenoy 80 (launched November 1858 at Toulon) – Transport 1881
- Castiglione 90 (1860 at Toulon) – Stricken 1881
- Masséna 90 (1860 at Toulon) – Stricken 1879
Suffren-class ships of the Second Republic and Second Empire
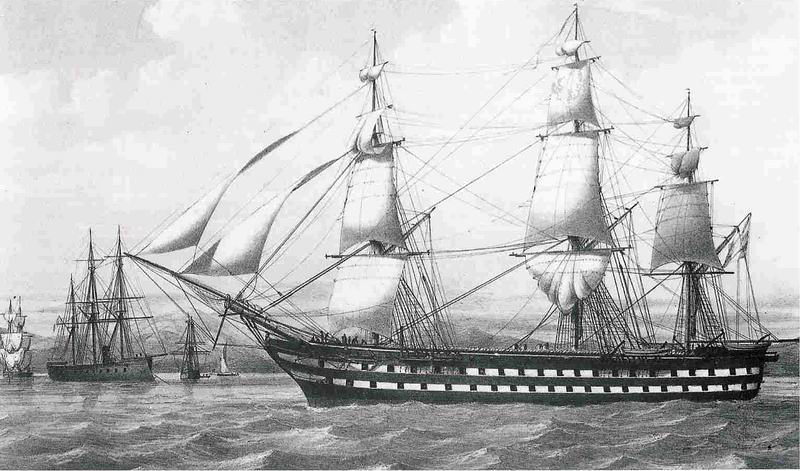
Portrait of Alexandre as a gunnery school ship, her engine removed after 1873. by François Roux.

=== Tourville-class ships of the line ===
The Tourville class was built along the line of razeed Océan-class three-deckers, giving them good stability and carrying capacity, but poor manoeuvrability for their size.

- Tourville 80 (launched 31 October 1853 at Brest) – Stricken 1872
- Duquesne 80 (launched 2 December 1853 at Brest) – Hulked 1867

=== Napoléon-class screw ships of the line ===
Designed by Henri Dupuy de Lôme as "swift ships of the line", the Napoléon class was the first to be designed from the conception to be steam battleships. Originally 3rd class, later redesignated as 2nd class.

- Napoléon 90 (launched 16 May 1850 at Toulon) – Stricken 1876

Algésiras sub-class

- Algésiras 90 (launched 4 October 1855 at Toulon) – Transport 1869
- Arcole 90 (launched 20 March 1855 at Cherbourg) – Stricken 1870
- Redoutable 90 (launched 25 October 1855 at Rochefort) – Stricken 1869
- Impérial 90 (launched 15 September 1856 at Brest) – Hulked 1869
- Intrépide 90 (launched 17 September 1864 at Rochefort) – Stricken 1889

Ville de Nantes sub-class

- Ville de Nantes 90 (launched 7 August 1858 at Cherbourg) – Stricken 1872
- Ville de Bordeaux 90 (launched 21 May 1860 at Lorient) – Stricken 1879
- Ville de Lyon 90 (launched 26 February 1861 at Brest) – Stricken 1883
Napoléon-class screw ships of the line
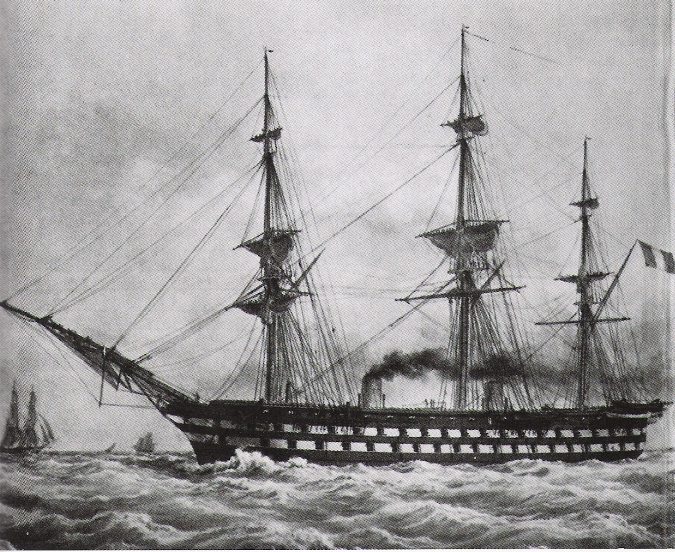
Napoléon, first steam battleship in history

=== Bretagne-class screw ships of the line ===
Capital ship designed on the same principles as the swift ships of the line of the Napoléon class

- Bretagne 130 (launched 17 February 1855 at Brest) – Training ship 1866
Bretagne-class screw ships of the line
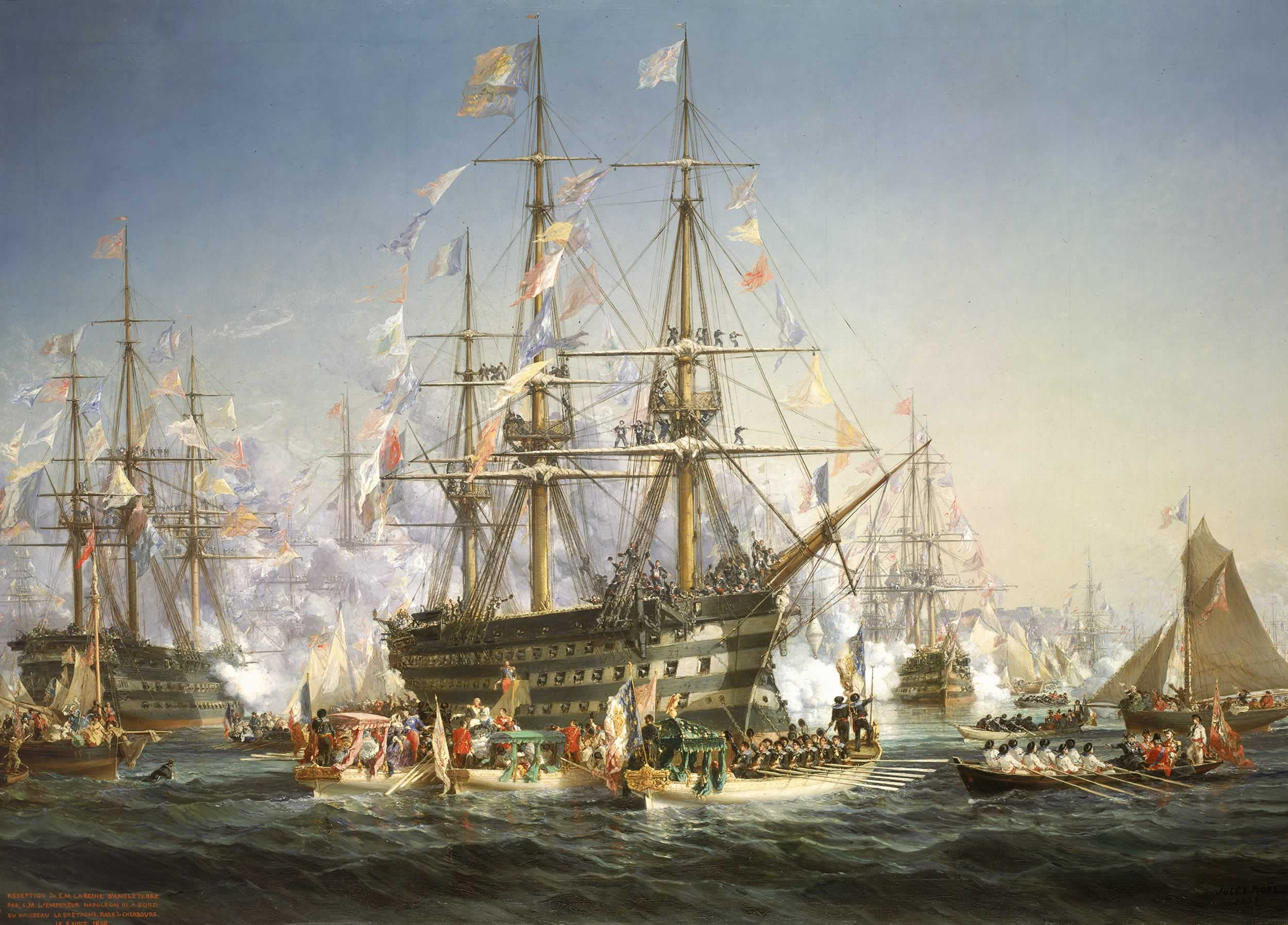
Bretagne, painting by Jules Achille Noël, National Maritime Museum, London.

== See also ==
- History of the French Navy
  - Flotte du Ponant
  - Levant Fleet
  - Troupes de la marine
  - Fusiliers Marins
  - List of Escorteurs of the French Navy
  - List of battleships of France
  - List of aircraft carriers of France
  - List of submarines of France
- Category:Ships of the line of the French Navy
- Category:Ships of the line of the Royal Navy
- Océan type 118-gun ship of the line
- List of French sail frigates
