= French ship Duguay-Trouin (1788) =

Ship of the line of the French Navy

- Scale model of Achille, sister ship of French ship Duguay-Trouin (1788), on display at the Musée national de la Marine in Paris.

History

France
- Name: Duguay-Trouin
- Namesake: René Duguay-Trouin
- Builder: Brest
- Laid down: 1787
- Launched: 30 October 1788
- Commissioned: July 1790
- Decommissioned: 1793
- Fate: Scuttled, 1793

General characteristics
- Class & type: Téméraire-class ship of the line
- Displacement: 3,069 tonneaux
- Tons burthen: 1,537 port tonneaux
- Length: 55.87 m (183 ft 4 in)
- Beam: 14.46 m (47 ft 5 in)
- Draught: 7.15 m (23.5 ft)
- Depth of hold: 7.15 m (23 ft 5 in)
- Sail plan: Full-rigged ship
- Crew: 705
- Armament: 74 guns: Lower gun deck: 28 × 36 pdr guns; Upper gun deck: 30 × 18 pdr guns; Forecastle and Quarterdeck: 16 × 8 pdr guns

Duguay-Trouin was a 74-gun Téméraire-class ship of the line built for the French Navy during the 1780s. Completed in 1785, she played a minor role in the French Revolutionary Wars.

== Description ==
The Téméraire-class ships had a length of 55.87 metres (183 ft 4 in), a beam of 14.46 metres (47 ft 5 in) and a depth of hold of 7.15 metres (23 ft 5 in). The ships displaced 3,069 tonneaux and had a mean draught of 7.15 metres (23 ft 5 in). They had a tonnage of 1,537 port tonneaux. Their crew numbered 705 officers and ratings during wartime. They were fitted with three masts and ship rigged.

The muzzle-loading, smoothbore armament of the Téméraire class consisted of twenty-eight 36-pounder long guns on the lower gun deck, thirty 18-pounder long guns and thirty 18-pounder long guns on the upper gun deck. On the quarterdeck and forecastle were a total of sixteen 8-pounder long guns. Beginning with the ships completed after 1787, the armament of the Téméraires began to change with the addition of four 36-pounder obusiers on the poop deck (dunette). Some ships had instead twenty 8-pounders.

== Construction and career ==
Duguay-Trouin was laid down at the Arsenal de Brest in 1787 and she was named on 25 August 1787. The ship was launched 30 October 1788 and completed in July 1790. In 1791, Duguay-Trouin ferried troops from Brest to Martinique and Saint Domingue, together with Amphitrite, Danaé, Éole, Apollon, Didon and Jupiter. The next year, she patrolled off Bretagne.

In 1793, Duguay-Trouin took part in the French expedition to Sardinia, and ran aground off Cagliari on 12 February, although she managed to break free five days later. Present at Toulon when the city was surrendered to the British by a rebellion of Royalists, she was scuttled by fire at the end of the Siege of Toulon. Her wreck was raised in 1807 and broken up.
