= French ship Éole =

Ten ships of the French Navy have borne the name Éole in honour of Aeolus

== Naval vessels named Éole ==
- Éole (1656), a 36-gun ship of the line
- Éole (1674), a 44-gun ship of the line
- Éole (1692), a 64-gun ship of the line
- Éole (1734), a 64-gun ship of the line
- Éole (1789), a Téméraire-class 74-gun ship of the line
- Robert (1797), a Victoire-class 64-gun ship of the line, was named Éole before taking her definitive name
- Éole (1798), a xebec
- Éole was an 18-gun corvette that the British Royal Navy captured in 1799 and took into service as HMS Nimrod. After the Royal Navy sold her in 1811 she became a whaler and was last listed in 1820.
- Anversois (1814), a Téméraire-class 74-gun ship of the line, was renamed Éole under the Bourbon Restoration
- Eylau (1856), a 100-gun Hercule-class ship of the line, was started as Éole before taking her definitive name

== Other vessels ==
- Éole was a French privateer lugger commissioned in 1810 that HMS Britomart, Osprey, and Leveret captured in 1812.

== See also ==
- HMS Aeolus
