= French ship Jean Bart (1820) =

Ship of the line of the French Navy

- Scale model of Achille, sister ship of French ship Jean Bart (1820), on display at the Musée national de la Marine in Paris.

History

France
- Name: Jean Bart
- Namesake: Jean Bart
- Builder: Lorient
- Laid down: 1811
- Launched: 25 August 1820
- Decommissioned: 26 October 1833
- Fate: Broken up 1833

General characteristics
- Class & type: Téméraire-class ship of the line
- Displacement: 3,069 tonneaux
- Tons burthen: 1,537 port tonneaux
- Length: 55.87 m (183 ft 4 in)
- Beam: 14.46 m (47 ft 5 in)
- Draught: 7.15 m (23.5 ft)
- Depth of hold: 7.15 m (23 ft 5 in)
- Sail plan: Full-rigged ship
- Crew: 705
- Armament: 74 guns: Lower gun deck: 28 × 36 pdr guns; Upper gun deck: 30 × 18 pdr guns; Forecastle and Quarterdeck: 16–28 × 8 pdr guns and 36 pdr carronades

Jean Bart was a 74-gun Téméraire-class ship of the line built for the French Navy during the 1810s. Completed in 1820, she played a minor role in the French campaign to topple the Liberal Spanish government in 1823.

== Description ==
Designed by Jacques-Noël Sané, the Téméraire-class ships had a length of 55.87 metres (183 ft 4 in), a beam of 14.46 metres (47 ft 5 in) and a depth of hold of 7.15 metres (23 ft 5 in). The ships displaced 3,069 tonneaux and had a mean draught of 7.15 metres (23 ft 5 in). They had a tonnage of 1,537 port tonneaux. Their crew numbered 705 officers and ratings during wartime. They were fitted with three masts and ship rigged.

The muzzle-loading, smoothbore armament of the Téméraire class consisted of twenty-eight 36-pounder long guns on the lower gun deck and thirty 18-pounder long guns on the upper gun deck. After about 1807, the armament on the quarterdeck and forecastle varied widely between ships with differing numbers of 8-pounder long guns and 36-pounder carronades. The total number of guns varied between sixteen and twenty-eight. The 36-pounder obusiers formerly mounted on the poop deck (dunette) in older ships were removed as obsolete.

== Construction and career ==
Jean Bart was ordered on 18 February 1811 and named on 18 April 1811. The ship was laid down on 21 June at the Arsenal de Lorient and launched on 25 August 1820. The ship was commissioned by Captain Menouvrier-Defresne on 1 October and completed in December. She cruised off Brazil in before returning to Brest. During the "Hundred Thousand Sons of Saint Louis" French campaign to topple the liberal government in Spain in 1823, Jean Bart captured the Spanish merchantman Nueva Veloce Mariana before patrolling the Caribbean. She cruised off South America again from 1828 to 1829 before being hulked in 1830. She was eventually scrapped in 1833.
