= French ship Jupiter (1789) =

Ship of the line of the French Navy

- Scale model of Achille, sister ship of French ship Jupiter (1789), on display at the Musée national de la Marine in Paris.

History

France
- Name: Jupiter
- Namesake: Jove; The Mountain; Democracy; Batavian Republic
- Ordered: 19 August 1787
- Builder: Brest
- Laid down: June 1788
- Launched: 4 November 1789
- Commissioned: August 1790
- Decommissioned: 1807
- Renamed: Montagnard in 1794; Démocrate on 18 May 1795; Jupiter on 30 May 1795; Batave on 27 April 1798
- Fate: Broken up in Brest in 1807

General characteristics
- Class & type: Téméraire-class ship of the line
- Displacement: 3,069 tonneaux
- Tons burthen: 1,537 port tonneaux
- Length: 55.87 m (183 ft 4 in)
- Beam: 14.46 m (47 ft 5 in)
- Draught: 7.15 m (23.5 ft)
- Depth of hold: 7.15 m (23 ft 5 in)
- Sail plan: Full-rigged ship
- Crew: 705
- Armament: 74 guns: Lower gun deck: 28 × 36 pdr guns; Upper gun deck: 30 × 18 pdr guns; Forecastle and Quarterdeck: 16 × 8 pdr guns

Jupiter was a 74-gun Téméraire-class ship of the line built for the French Navy during the 1780s. Completed in 1790, she played a minor role in the French Revolutionary Wars.

== Description ==
The Téméraire-class ships had a length of 55.87 metres (183 ft 4 in), a beam of 14.46 metres (47 ft 5 in) and a depth of hold of 7.15 metres (23 ft 5 in). The ships displaced 3,069 tonneaux and had a mean draught of 7.15 metres (23 ft 5 in). They had a tonnage of 1,537 port tonneaux. Their crew numbered 705 officers and ratings during wartime. They were fitted with three masts and ship rigged.

The muzzle-loading, smoothbore armament of the Téméraire class consisted of twenty-eight 36-pounder long guns on the lower gun deck, thirty 18-pounder long guns and thirty 18-pounder long guns on the upper gun deck. On the quarterdeck and forecastle were a total of sixteen 8-pounder long guns. Beginning with the ships completed after 1787, the armament of the Téméraires began to change with the addition of four 36-pounder obusiers on the poop deck (dunette). Some ships had instead twenty 8-pounders.

== Construction and career ==
Jupiter was ordered on 19 October 1787 and laid down at the Arsenal de Rochefort in June 1788. The ship was launched on 4 November 1789 and completed in October 1790. In 1790, under Captain Belugat, Jupiter was part of the 1st Division of the Brest squadron, under Du Chilleau de La Roche, along with Apollon and the 32-gun frigate Surveillante, under Sarcé. In August 1790, Captain Gouzillon de Bélizal took command, which he retained until 1791.

Between 1791 and 1793, Jupiter was based in Saint-Domingue. In March 1794, she was renamed Montagnard. On 29 May, during the May 1794 Atlantic campaign, she encountered a British squadron; in the ensuing engagement, she sustained damage which prevented her from taking part in the subsequent battle of the Glorious First of June itself. The ship was renamed Démocrate on 18 May 1795, and back to Jupiter on 30 May. On 7 August, she took part in the recapture from the British of Censeur. The ship was renamed Batave on 27 April 1798. The next year, she took part in the Croisière de Bruix. Condemned in 1807, she was broken up in Brest.
