= French ship Couronne =

Fourteen ships of the French Navy or the Galley Corps (which was separate from the Navy) of the Ancien Régime or Empire have borne the name Couronne ("crown"):

- Couronne (1636), the first major warship to be built in France – actually launched in 1632/33
- Couronne (1664), a flûte or storeship (1664–1677)
- Couronne (1664), a galley (1665–1675) built as Vendôme in 1663 but renamed Couronne in 1665
- Couronne (1669), an 82-gun ship of the line (1669–1712)
- Couronne (1674), a 6-gun fire ship (1674–1677)
- Couronne (1677), a galley (1677–1686)
- Couronne (1686), a galley (1686–1696)
- Couronne (1697), a galley (1697–1716)
- Couronne (1749), a 74-gun ship of the line (1749–1795)
- Couronne (1768), an 80-gun ship of the line (1768–1781)
- Couronne an 80-gun ship. Renamed Ça Ira in 1793, captured by Britain 1795. She was destroyed in an accidental fire in 1796.
- Minerve (1831), a 32-gun frigate, bore the name Couronne while under construction as a Téméraire-class ship of the line
- Couronne (1813), a Téméraire-class 74-gun ship of the line (1813)
- Couronne (1824), a Téméraire-class 80-gun ship of the line (1824–1869)
- Couronne (1861), an iron-hulled derivative of the Gloire-class ironclad
