= French ship Duguesclin (1807) =

Ship of the line of the French Navy

- Scale model of Achille, sister ship of French ship Duguesclin (1807), on display at the Musée national de la Marine in Paris.

History

France
- Name: Duguesclin
- Namesake: Bertrand du Guesclin
- Builder: Antwerp
- Laid down: June 1804
- Launched: 20 June 1807
- Decommissioned: 1817
- Fate: Broken up, 1820

General characteristics
- Class & type: petit Téméraire-class ship of the line
- Displacement: 2,781 tonneaux
- Tons burthen: 1,381 port tonneaux
- Length: 53.97 m (177 ft 1 in)
- Beam: 14.29 m (46 ft 11 in)
- Draught: 6.72 m (22.0 ft)
- Depth of hold: 6.9 m (22 ft 8 in)
- Sail plan: Full-rigged ship
- Crew: 705
- Armament: 74 guns: Lower gun deck: 28 × 36 pdr guns; Upper gun deck: 30 × 18 pdr guns; Forecastle and Quarterdeck: 12 × 8 pdr guns & 14 × 36 pdr carronades

Duguesclin was a 74-gun petite Téméraire-class ship of the line built for the French Navy during the first decade of the 19th century. Completed in 1808, she played a minor role in the Napoleonic Wars.

== Background and description ==
Duguesclin was one of the petit modèle of the Téméraire class that was specially intended for construction in some of the shipyards in countries occupied by the French, where there was less depth of water than in the main French shipyards. The ships had a length of 53.97 metres (177 ft 1 in), a beam of 14.29 metres (46 ft 11 in) and a depth of hold of 6.9 metres (22 ft 8 in). The ships displaced 2,781 tonneaux and had a mean draught of 6.72 metres (22 ft 1 in). They had a tonnage of 1,381 port tonneaux. Their crew numbered 705 officers and ratings during wartime. They were fitted with three masts and ship rigged.

The muzzle-loading, smoothbore armament of the Téméraire class consisted of twenty-eight 36-pounder long guns on the lower gun deck and thirty 18-pounder long guns on the upper gun deck. The petit modèle ships ordered in 1803–1804 were intended to mount sixteen 8-pounder long guns on their forecastle and quarterdeck, plus four 36-pounder obusiers on the poop deck (dunette). Later ships were intended to have fourteen 8-pounders and ten 36-pounder carronades without any obusiers, but the numbers of 8-pounders and carronades actually varied between a total of 20 to 26 weapons. Duguesclin had a dozen 8-pounders and 14 carronades.

== Construction and career ==
Duguesclin was ordered on 24 April 1804 and laid down in July in Antwerp. The ship was launched on 20 June 1807. She was commissioned in 24 July and sent to Vlissingen in September to be fitted out. Duguesculin was completed in March 1808. The ship was allocated to France on 1 August 1814 when the Scheldt squadron was divided and arrived at Brest in October. She was condemned in June 1818, hulked in the Arsenal de Lorient and her breaking up was approved on 11 January 1820.
