= French ship Dantzig =

At least two ships of the French Navy have been named Dantzig:

- French ship Dantzig (1641) a 16-gun vessel in service 1641–1649
- French ship Dantzig (1807) a 74-gun Téméraire-class ship of the line launched in 1807 and struck in 1816
