= French ship Vengeur (1789) =

Ship of the line of the French Navy

- Scale model of Achille, sister ship of French ship Vengeur (1789), on display at the Musée national de la Marine in Paris.

History

France
- Name: Vengeur
- Builder: Brest
- Laid down: 23 May 1788
- Launched: 16 December 1789
- Commissioned: 20 August 1790
- Fate: Sunk on 12 December 1792

General characteristics
- Class & type: Téméraire-class ship of the line
- Displacement: 3,069 tonneaux
- Tons burthen: 1,537 port tonneaux
- Length: 55.87 m (183 ft 4 in)
- Beam: 14.46 m (47 ft 5 in)
- Draught: 7.15 m (23.5 ft)
- Depth of hold: 7.15 m (23 ft 5 in)
- Sail plan: Full-rigged ship
- Crew: 705
- Armament: 74 guns: Lower gun deck: 28 × 36 pdr guns; Upper gun deck: 30 × 18 pdr guns; Forecastle and Quarterdeck: 16 × 8 pdr guns

Vengeur was a 74-gun Téméraire-class ship of the line built for the French Navy during the 1780s. Completed in 1790, she played a minor role in the French Revolutionary Wars.

== Description ==
The Téméraire-class ships had a length of 55.87 metres (183 ft 4 in), a beam of 14.46 metres (47 ft 5 in) and a depth of hold of 7.15 metres (23 ft 5 in). The ships displaced 3,069 tonneaux and had a mean draught of 7.15 metres (23 ft 5 in). They had a tonnage of 1,537 port tonneaux. Their crew numbered 705 officers and ratings during wartime. They were fitted with three masts and ship rigged.

The muzzle-loading, smoothbore armament of the Téméraire class consisted of twenty-eight 36-pounder long guns on the lower gun deck, thirty 18-pounder long guns and thirty 18-pounder long guns on the upper gun deck. On the quarterdeck and forecastle were a total of sixteen 8-pounder long guns. Beginning with the ships completed after 1787, the armament of the Téméraires began to change with the addition of four 36-pounder obusiers on the poop deck (dunette). Some ships had instead twenty 8-pounders.

== Construction and career ==
Vengeur was ordered on 19 October 1787 laid down at the Arsenal de Brest on 23 May 1788. The ship was launched 16 December 1789 and completed on 8 June 1790. In 1792, captained by Le Dall Kéréon, she was part to a squadron under Latouche-Tréville. On 26 August, she bombarded the city of Oneglia. On 12 December 1792, she ran aground off Ajaccio. After attempts to refloat her proved unsuccessful, the ship was burned on 8 June 1793.

== Bibliography ==
- Roche, Jean-Michel (2005). Dictionnaire des bâtiments de la flotte de guerre française de Colbert à nos jours 1 1671–1870. ISBN 978-2-9525917-0-6. OCLC 165892922.
- Winfield, Rif and Roberts, Stephen S. (2015) French Warships in the Age of Sail 1786-1861: Design, Construction, Careers and Fates. Seaforth Publishing. ISBN 978-1-84832-204-2
