= French ship Danube (1808) =

Ship of the line of the French Navy

- Scale model of Achille, sister ship of French ship Danube (1808), on display at the Musée national de la Marine in Paris.

History

France
- Name: Danube
- Namesake: Danube river
- Builder: Toulon
- Laid down: 1806
- Launched: 21 December 1808
- Decommissioned: 1827
- Fate: Broken up

General characteristics
- Class & type: Téméraire-class ship of the line
- Displacement: 3,069 tonneaux
- Tons burthen: 1,537 port tonneaux
- Length: 55.87 m (183 ft 4 in)
- Beam: 14.46 m (47 ft 5 in)
- Draught: 7.15 m (23.5 ft)
- Depth of hold: 7.15 m (23 ft 5 in)
- Sail plan: Full-rigged ship
- Crew: 705
- Armament: 74 guns: Lower gun deck: 28 × 36 pdr guns; Upper gun deck: 30 × 18 pdr guns; Forecastle and Quarterdeck: 16 × 8 pdr guns

Danube was a 74-gun Téméraire-class ship of the line built for the French Navy during the first decade of the 19th century. Completed in 1809, she played a minor role in the Napoleonic Wars.

== Description ==
Designed by Jacques-Noël Sané, the Téméraire-class ships had a length of 55.87 metres (183 ft 4 in), a beam of 14.46 metres (47 ft 5 in) and a depth of hold of 7.15 metres (23 ft 5 in). The ships displaced 3,069 tonneaux and had a mean draught of 7.15 metres (23 ft 5 in). They had a tonnage of 1,537 port tonneaux. Their crew numbered 705 officers and ratings during wartime. They were fitted with three masts and ship rigged.

The muzzle-loading, smoothbore armament of the Téméraire class consisted of twenty-eight 36-pounder long guns on the lower gun deck and thirty 18-pounder long guns on the upper gun deck. On the quarterdeck and forecastle were a total of sixteen 8-pounder long guns. Beginning with the ships completed after 1787, the armament of the Téméraires began to change with the addition of four 36-pounder obusiers on the poop deck (dunette). Some ships had instead twenty 8-pounders.

== Construction and career ==
Danube was ordered on 11 August 1806 and laid down on 1 June 1807 at the Arsenal de Toulon. The ship was launched on 21 December 1808, completed in August 1809 and commissioned on 28 August. Danube was recommissioned on 15 June 1810 by Captain Antoine Henry using the men from the 2nd Battalion of the Line (2^{e} bataillon de ligne).

The ship became a training ship in 1882. Danube was struck and ordered to be broken up on 18 December 1826.
