= French ship Ajax (1806) =

French naval vessel

- Scale model of Achille, sister ship of French ship Ajax (1806), on display at the Musée national de la Marine in Paris.

History

France
- Name: Ajax
- Namesake: Ajax
- Builder: Lorient
- Laid down: 23 November 1804
- Launched: 17 June 1806
- Decommissioned: 1815
- Fate: Broken up

General characteristics
- Class & type: Téméraire-class ship of the line
- Displacement: 3,069 tonneaux
- Tons burthen: 1,537 port tonneaux
- Length: 55.87 m (183 ft 4 in)
- Beam: 14.46 m (47 ft 5 in)
- Draught: 7.15 m (23.5 ft)
- Depth of hold: 7.15 m (23 ft 5 in)
- Sail plan: Full-rigged ship
- Crew: 705
- Armament: 74 guns: Lower gun deck: 28 × 36 pdr guns; Upper gun deck: 30 × 18 pdr guns; Forecastle and Quarterdeck: 16 × 8 pdr guns

Ajax was a 74-gun Téméraire-class ship of the line built for the French Navy during the 1790s. Completed in 1806, she played a minor role in the Napoleonic Wars.

== Description ==
Designed by Jacques-Noël Sané, the Téméraire-class ships had a length of 55.87 metres (183 ft 4 in), a beam of 14.46 metres (47 ft 5 in) and a depth of hold of 7.15 metres (23 ft 5 in). The ships displaced 3,069 tonneaux and had a mean draught of 7.15 metres (23 ft 5 in). They had a tonnage of 1,537 port tonneaux. Their crew numbered 705 officers and ratings during wartime. They were fitted with three masts and ship rigged.

The muzzle-loading, smoothbore armament of the Téméraire class consisted of twenty-eight 36-pounder long guns on the lower gun deck and thirty 18-pounder long guns on the upper gun deck. On the quarterdeck and forecastle were a total of sixteen 8-pounder long guns. Beginning with the ships completed after 1787, the armament of the Téméraires began to change with the addition of four 36-pounder obusiers on the poop deck (dunette). Some ships had instead twenty 8-pounders.

== Construction and career ==
Ajax was ordered on 6 April 1804 and laid down on 23 November 1804 at the Arsenal de Rochefort. The ship was launched on 17 June 1806. The ship was commissioned by Captain Jean-Nicolas Petit on 26 August 1806 and completed in September. Ajax replaced her sister ship Jemmapes in Zacharie Allemand's squadron later that year. In 1808, she transferred to Toulon, where she later became a floating battery in 1815.
