= French ship Duguay-Trouin (1813) =

Ship of the line of the French Navy

- Scale model of Achille, sister ship of French ship Duguay-Trouin (1813), on display at the Musée national de la Marine in Paris.

History

France
- Name: Duguay-Trouin
- Namesake: René Duguay-Trouin
- Builder: Cherbourg
- Laid down: 6 May 1811
- Launched: 10 November 1813
- Decommissioned: 1826
- Fate: Broken up, 1826

General characteristics
- Class & type: Téméraire-class ship of the line
- Displacement: 3,069 tonneaux
- Tons burthen: 1,537 port tonneaux
- Length: 55.87 m (183 ft 4 in)
- Beam: 14.46 m (47 ft 5 in)
- Draught: 7.15 m (23.5 ft)
- Depth of hold: 7.15 m (23 ft 5 in)
- Sail plan: Full-rigged ship
- Crew: 705
- Armament: 74 guns: Lower gun deck: 28 × 36 pdr guns; Upper gun deck: 30 × 18 pdr guns; Forecastle and Quarterdeck: 16–28 × 8 pdr guns and 36 pdr carronades

Duguay-Trouin was a 74-gun Téméraire-class ship of the line built for the French Navy during the 1810s. Completed in 1814, she had an uneventful career. The ship was condemned in 1824, hulked the following year and broken up for scrap in 1826.

== Description ==
Designed by Jacques-Noël Sané, the Téméraire-class ships had a length of 55.87 metres (183 ft 4 in), a beam of 14.46 metres (47 ft 5 in) and a depth of hold of 7.15 metres (23 ft 5 in). The ships displaced 3,069 tonneaux and had a mean draught of 7.15 metres (23 ft 5 in). They had a tonnage of 1,537 port tonneaux. Their crew numbered 705 officers and ratings during wartime. They were fitted with three masts and ship rigged.

The muzzle-loading, smoothbore armament of the Téméraire class consisted of twenty-eight 36-pounder long guns on the lower gun deck and thirty 18-pounder long guns on the upper gun deck. After about 1807, the armament on the quarterdeck and forecastle varied widely between ships with differing numbers of 8-pounder long guns and 36-pounder carronades. The total number of guns varied between sixteen and twenty-eight. The 36-pounder obusiers formerly mounted on the poop deck (dunette) in older ships were removed as obsolete.

== Construction and career ==
Construction of Duguay-Trouin began in 1810 at Le Havre, but her timber was transferred to the Arsenal de Cherbourg after September 1810. The ship was laid down on 6 May 1811 and launched on 10 November 1813. The ship was commissioned on 21 December and completed in May 1814. Duguay-Trouin was condemned in December 1824 and ordered to be converted into a storage hulk on 10 February 1825. The ship was struck from the navy list in 1826 and subsequently broken up.
