= French ship Audacieux (1816) =

Ship of the line of the French Navy

- Scale model of Achille, sister ship of French ship Audacieux (1816), on display at the Musée national de la Marine in Paris.

History

France
- Name: Audacieux
- Builder: Schuyt, Amsterdam
- Laid down: 1812
- Launched: October 1816
- Fate: Seized on slip by Holland 1813, wrecked 16 January 1827

General characteristics
- Class & type: petit Téméraire-class ship of the line
- Displacement: 2,781 tonneaux
- Tons burthen: 1,381 port tonneaux
- Length: 53.97 m (177 ft 1 in)
- Beam: 14.29 m (46 ft 11 in)
- Draught: 6.72 m (22.0 ft)
- Depth of hold: 6.9 m (22 ft 8 in)
- Sail plan: Full-rigged ship
- Crew: 705
- Armament: 74 guns: Lower gun deck: 28 × 36 pdr guns; Upper gun deck: 30 × 18 pdr guns; Forecastle and Quarterdeck: 20–26 × 8 pdr guns & 36 pdr carronades

Audacieux was a 74-gun petite Téméraire-class ship of the line built for the French Navy during the 1810s. Completed in 1816, she was captured by the Netherlands while still under construction.

== Background and description ==
Audacieux was one of the petit modèle of the Téméraire class that was specially intended for construction in some of the shipyards in countries occupied by the French, where there was less depth of water than in the main French shipyards. The ships had a length of 53.97 metres (177 ft 1 in), a beam of 14.29 metres (46 ft 11 in) and a depth of hold of 6.9 metres (22 ft 8 in). The ships displaced 2,781 tonneaux and had a mean draught of 6.72 metres (22 ft 1 in). They had a tonnage of 1,381 port tonneaux. Their crew numbered 705 officers and ratings during wartime. They were fitted with three masts and ship rigged.

The muzzle-loading, smoothbore armament of the Téméraire class consisted of twenty-eight 36-pounder long guns on the lower gun deck and thirty 18-pounder long guns on the upper gun deck. The petit modèle ships ordered in 1803–1804 were intended to mount sixteen 8-pounder long guns on their forecastle and quarterdeck, plus four 36-pounder obusiers on the poop deck (dunette). Later ships were intended to have fourteen 8-pounders and ten 36-pounder carronades without any obusiers, but the numbers of 8-pounders and carronades actually varied between a total of 20 to 26 weapons.

== Construction and career ==
Audacieux was laid down in December 1812 in Amsterdam and was seized by the Dutch when the French evacuated the city on 14 November 1813. She was renamed Coalitie, then to Wassenaar. The ship was launched in October 1816 and completed the following year. She was wrecked on 16 January 1827.
