= French ship Commerce de Lyon (1807) =

Ship of the line of the French Navy

- Scale model of Achille, sister ship of French ship Commerce de Lyon (1807), on display at the Musée national de la Marine in Paris.

History

France
- Name: Commerce de Lyon
- Builder: Antwerp
- Laid down: November 1803
- Launched: 9 April 1807
- Decommissioned: 12 February 1819
- Fate: Broken up, 1830

General characteristics
- Class & type: petit Téméraire-class ship of the line
- Displacement: 2,781 tonneaux
- Tons burthen: 1,381 port tonneaux
- Length: 53.97 m (177 ft 1 in)
- Beam: 14.29 m (46 ft 11 in)
- Draught: 6.72 m (22.0 ft)
- Depth of hold: 6.9 m (22 ft 8 in)
- Sail plan: Full-rigged ship
- Crew: 705
- Armament: 74 guns: Lower gun deck: 28 × 36 pdr guns; Upper gun deck: 30 × 18 pdr guns; Forecastle and Quarterdeck: 12 × 8 pdr guns & 14 × 36 pdr carronades

Commerce de Lyon was a 74-gun petite Téméraire-class ship of the line built for the French Navy during the first decade of the 19th century. Completed in 1808, she played a minor role in the Napoleonic Wars.

== Background and description ==
Commerce de Lyon was one of the petit modèle of the Téméraire class that was specially intended for construction in some of the shipyards in countries occupied by the French, where there was less depth of water than in the main French shipyards. The ships had a length of 53.97 metres (177 ft 1 in), a beam of 14.29 metres (46 ft 11 in) and a depth of hold of 6.9 metres (22 ft 8 in). The ships displaced 2,781 tonneaux and had a mean draught of 6.72 metres (22 ft 1 in). They had a tonnage of 1,381 port tonneaux. Their crew numbered 705 officers and ratings during wartime. They were fitted with three masts and ship rigged.

The muzzle-loading, smoothbore armament of the Téméraire class consisted of twenty-eight 36-pounder long guns on the lower gun deck and thirty 18-pounder long guns on the upper gun deck. The petit modèle ships ordered in 1803–1804 were intended to mount sixteen 8-pounder long guns on their forecastle and quarterdeck, plus four 36-pounder obusiers on the poop deck (dunette). Later ships were intended to have fourteen 8-pounders and ten 36-pounder carronades without any obusiers, but the numbers of 8-pounders and carronades actually varied between a total of 20 to 26 weapons. Commerce de Lyon had a dozen 8-pounders and 14 carronades.

== Construction and career ==
Commerce de Lyon was ordered on 29 September 1803 and laid down in November in Antwerp. The ship was launched on 9 April 1807. She was commissioned by Commander Victor-André Hulot-Gury, the following day and transferred to Vlissingen in June to begin fitting out and completed in March 1808. Commerce de Lyon was part of Vice-amiral Missiessy's squadron of the Escaut from 1810 to 1813. In March 1813, she was appointed to defend Antwerp. After the Treaty of Paris in 1814, she was one of the 12 ships of the line France was authorised to keep, and she was sailed to Brest in October. Put in ordinary there, the ship was never reactivated; she was struck on 23 February 1819, hulked and broken up in 1830–1831.
