= French ship Généreux (1831) =

Ship of the line of the French Navy

- Scale model of Achille, sister ship of French ship Généreux (1831), on display at the Musée national de la Marine in Paris.

History

France
- Name: Généreux
- Namesake: Generous
- Ordered: 10 September 1812
- Builder: Cherbourg
- Laid down: 3 July 1813
- Launched: 23 September 1831
- Decommissioned: 21 November 1855
- Fate: Broken up

General characteristics
- Class & type: Téméraire-class ship of the line
- Displacement: 3,069 tonneaux
- Tons burthen: 1,537 port tonneaux
- Length: 55.87 m (183 ft 4 in)
- Beam: 14.46 m (47 ft 5 in)
- Draught: 7.15 m (23.5 ft)
- Depth of hold: 7.15 m (23 ft 5 in)
- Sail plan: Full-rigged ship
- Crew: 705
- Armament: 74 guns: Lower gun deck: 28 × 36 pdr guns; Upper gun deck: 30 × 18 pdr guns; Forecastle and Quarterdeck: 16–28 × 8 pdr guns and 36 pdr carronades

Généreux was a 74-gun Téméraire-class ship of the line built for the French Navy during the 1810s. Completed in 1832, she was not commissioned until 1839.

== Description ==
Designed by Jacques-Noël Sané, the Téméraire-class ships had a length of 55.87 metres (183 ft 4 in), a beam of 14.46 metres (47 ft 5 in) and a depth of hold of 7.15 metres (23 ft 5 in). The ships displaced 3,069 tonneaux and had a mean draught of 7.15 metres (23 ft 5 in). They had a tonnage of 1,537 port tonneaux. Their crew numbered 705 officers and ratings during wartime. They were fitted with three masts and ship rigged.

The muzzle-loading, smoothbore armament of the Téméraire class consisted of twenty-eight 36-pounder long guns on the lower gun deck and thirty 18-pounder long guns on the upper gun deck. After about 1807, the armament on the quarterdeck and forecastle varied widely between ships with differing numbers of 8-pounder long guns and 36-pounder carronades. The total number of guns varied between sixteen and twenty-eight. The 36-pounder obusiers formerly mounted on the poop deck (dunette) in older ships were removed as obsolete.

== Construction and career ==
Généreux was laid down on 3 July 1813 at the Arsenal de Lorient and launched on 23 September 1831. The ship was completed in 1832 and commissioned on 11 February 1839. 1839, when she was appointed to Admiral Lalande's squadron in the Levant, under Captain Durand. In 1841, Généreux served in the Mediterranean under Captain Graëb. The ship was ordered to be converted to a troop ship in January 1852, but was used instead to house political prisoners being deported to French Algeria until July. She was stricken on 21 November 1855, and served as barracks in Toulon until 1865 before being broken up.
