= French ship Polyphème =

At least two ships of the French Navy have been named Polyphème:

- Polyphème, a Téméraire-class 74-gun ship of the line launched in 1817 and decommissioned in 1832
- Tage, a 100-gun Hercule-class ship of the line laid down as Polyphème in 1824
