= French ship Piet Hein (1812) =

Ship of the line of the French Navy

- Scale model of Achille, sister ship of French ship Piet Hein (1812), on display at the Musée national de la Marine in Paris.

History

France
- Name: Piet Hein
- Namesake: Piet Pieterszoon Hein
- Builder: Venice
- Laid down: January 1807
- Launched: 15 August 1812
- Commissioned: October 1812
- Decommissioned: 1838
- Fate: Broken up, 1819

General characteristics
- Class & type: petit Téméraire-class ship of the line
- Displacement: 2,781 tonneaux
- Tons burthen: 1,381 port tonneaux
- Length: 54.9 m (180 ft 1 in)
- Beam: 14.29 m (46 ft 11 in)
- Draught: 6.72 m (22.0 ft)
- Depth of hold: 6.9 m (22 ft 8 in)
- Sail plan: Full-rigged ship
- Crew: 705
- Armament: 74 guns: Lower gun deck: 28 × 36 pdr guns; Upper gun deck: 30 × 18 pdr guns; Forecastle and Quarterdeck: 20–26 × 8 pdr guns & 36 pdr carronades

Piet Hein was a 74-gun petite Téméraire-class ship of the line built for the French Navy during the first decade of the 19th century. Completed in 1813, she played a minor role in the Napoleonic Wars.

== Background and description ==
Piet Hien was one of the petit modèle of the Téméraire class that was specially intended for construction in some of the shipyards in countries occupied by the French, where there was less depth of water than in the main French shipyards. The ships had a length of 54.9 metres (180 ft 1 in), a beam of 14.29 metres (46 ft 11 in) and a depth of hold of 6.9 metres (22 ft 8 in). The ships displaced 2,781 tonneaux and had a mean draught of 6.72 metres (22 ft 1 in). They had a tonnage of 1,381 port tonneaux. Their crew numbered 705 officers and ratings during wartime. They were fitted with three masts and ship rigged.

The muzzle-loading, smoothbore armament of the Téméraire class consisted of twenty-eight 36-pounder long guns on the lower gun deck and thirty 18-pounder long guns on the upper gun deck. The petit modèle ships ordered in 1803–1804 were intended to mount sixteen 8-pounder long guns on their forecastle and quarterdeck, plus four 36-pounder obusiers on the poop deck (dunette). Later ships were intended to have fourteen 8-pounders and ten 36-pounder carronades without any obusiers, but the numbers of 8-pounders and carronades actually varied between a total of 20 to 26 weapons.

== Construction and career ==
Piet Hien was laid down in March 1806 by the Royal Netherlands Navy in Rotterdam as Admiraal Piet Hien to their standard design of 80-gun ships. The ship was still under construction when Napoleon annexed the Kingdom of Holland into the French Empire on 9 July 1810. Napoleon ordered her disassembled and reworked on 14 February 1811 as a petit modèle Téméraire class, although she differed slightly from the standard design in her length. She was renamed Piet Hien in April and re-laid down on 1 June 1811. The ship was launched on 1 May 1813. Piet Hein was surrendered to Holland at the fall of Rotterdam in December 1813. She was renamed Admiraal Piet Hein, and eventually broken up in 1819.
