= French ship Quatorze Juillet (1798) =

Ship of the line of the French Navy

- Scale model of Achille, sister ship of French ship Quatorze Juillet (1798), on display at the Musée national de la Marine in Paris.

History

France
- Name: Quatorze Juillet
- Namesake: 14 July (for Bastille Day)
- Ordered: 23 May 1794
- Builder: Lorient
- Laid down: August 1794
- Launched: 1 February 1798
- Stricken: 28 April 1798
- Fate: Burned April 1798

General characteristics
- Class & type: Téméraire-class ship of the line
- Displacement: 3,069 tonneaux
- Tons burthen: 1,537 port tonneaux
- Length: 55.87 m (183 ft 4 in)
- Beam: 14.46 m (47 ft 5 in)
- Draught: 7.15 m (23.5 ft)
- Depth of hold: 7.15 m (23 ft 5 in)
- Sail plan: Full-rigged ship
- Crew: 705
- Armament: 74 guns: Lower gun deck: 28 × 36 pdr guns; Upper gun deck: 30 × 18 pdr guns; Forecastle and Quarterdeck: 16 × 8 pdr guns

Quatorze Juillet was a 74-gun Téméraire-class ship of the line built for the French Navy during the 1790s. Completed in 1798, she played a minor role in the French Revolutionary Wars.

== Description ==
Designed by Jacques-Noël Sané, the Téméraire-class ships had an overall length of 55.87 metres (183 ft 4 in) and a length at the waterline of 50.35 metres (165 ft 2 in). They had a beam of 14.46 metres (47 ft 5 in) and a depth of hold of 7.15 metres (23 ft 5 in). The ships displaced 3,069 tonneaux and had a mean draught of 7.15 metres (23 ft 5 in). They had a tonnage of 1,537 port tonneaux. Their crew numbered 705 officers and ratings during wartime. They were fitted with three masts and ship rigged.

The muzzle-loading, smoothbore armament of the Téméraire class consisted of twenty-eight 36-pounder long guns on the lower gun deck and thirty 18-pounder long guns on the upper gun deck. On the quarterdeck and forecastle were a total of sixteen 8-pounder long guns. Beginning with the ships completed after 1787, the armament of the Téméraires began to change with the addition of four 36-pounder obusiers on the poop deck (dunette). Some ships had instead twenty 8-pounders.

== Construction and career ==
Quatorze Juillet was ordered on 23 May 1794, laid down at the Arsenal de Lorient in August. She was named on 19 January 1795 to commemorate the storming of the Bastille on 14 July 1789. The ship was launched on 1 February 1798 and completed two days later. While fitting out Quatorze Juillet caught fire and was destroyed on 29 April.
