= French ship Anversois =

Ship of the line of the French Navy

- Scale model of Achille, sister ship of French ship Anversois, on display at the Musée national de la Marine in Paris.

History

France
- Name: Anversois
- Builder: Antwerp
- Laid down: May 1803
- Launched: 7 June 1807
- Decommissioned: 1815
- Fate: Broken up 1819

General characteristics
- Class & type: petit Téméraire-class ship of the line
- Displacement: 2,781 tonneaux
- Tons burthen: 1,381 port tonneaux
- Length: 53.97 m (177 ft 1 in)
- Beam: 14.29 m (46 ft 11 in)
- Draught: 6.72 m (22.0 ft)
- Depth of hold: 6.9 m (22 ft 8 in)
- Sail plan: Full-rigged ship
- Crew: 705
- Armament: 74 guns: Lower gun deck: 28 × 36 pdr guns; Upper gun deck: 30 × 18 pdr guns; Forecastle and Quarterdeck: 12 × 8 pdr guns & 14 × 36 pdr carronades

Anversois was a 74-gun petite Téméraire-class ship of the line built for the French Navy during the first decade of the 19th century. Completed in 1808, she played a minor role in the Napoleonic Wars.

== Background and description ==
Commerce de Lyon was one of the petit modèle of the Téméraire class that was specially intended for construction in some of the shipyards in countries occupied by the French, where there was less depth of water than in the main French shipyards. The ships had a length of 53.97 metres (177 ft 1 in), a beam of 14.29 metres (46 ft 11 in) and a depth of hold of 6.9 metres (22 ft 8 in). The ships displaced 2,781 tonneaux and had a mean draught of 6.72 metres (22 ft 1 in). They had a tonnage of 1,381 port tonneaux. Their crew numbered 705 officers and ratings during wartime. They were fitted with three masts and ship rigged.

The muzzle-loading, smoothbore armament of the Téméraire class consisted of twenty-eight 36-pounder long guns on the lower gun deck and thirty 18-pounder long guns on the upper gun deck. The petit modèle ships ordered in 1803–1804 were intended to mount sixteen 8-pounder long guns on their forecastle and quarterdeck, plus four 36-pounder obusiers on the poop deck (dunette). Later ships were intended to have fourteen 8-pounders and ten 36-pounder carronades without any obusiers, but the numbers of 8-pounders and carronades actually varied between a total of 20 to 26 weapons. Anversois had a dozen 8-pounders and 14 carronades.

== Construction and career ==
Anversois was ordered on 24 April 1804 and laid down in June in Antwerp. The ship was launched on 7 June 1807 and commissioned on 8 June. Anversois was transferred to Vlissingen in October to fitted out and completed in March 1808. In 1814, she took part in the defence of the city, attacking the Forts Frederick Henry on 21 March and Lacroix the next day. At the Bourbon Restoration in 1814, she was renamed Éole, returned to her original name during the Hundred Days, and Éole back again in 1815. In 1818, she was found to be in such poor state that she could not be used even as a hulk, condemned on 23 February 1819 and was ordered to be broken up on 3 December.
