= French ship Couronne (1824) =

Ship of the line of the French Navy

- Scale model of Achille, sister ship of French ship Couronne (1824), on display at the Musée national de la Marine in Paris.

History

France
- Name: Couronne
- Namesake: Crown
- Builder: Brest
- Laid down: 1813
- Launched: 25 August 1824
- Renamed: Barricade, 1848-49; Duperré, 1849
- Fate: Broken up in 1870

General characteristics
- Class & type: Téméraire-class ship of the line
- Displacement: 3,069 tonneaux
- Tons burthen: 1,537 port tonneaux
- Length: 55.87 m (183 ft 4 in)
- Beam: 14.46 m (47 ft 5 in)
- Draught: 7.15 m (23.5 ft)
- Depth of hold: 7.15 m (23 ft 5 in)
- Sail plan: Full-rigged ship
- Crew: 705
- Armament: 74 guns: Lower gun deck: 28 × 36 pdr guns; Upper gun deck: 30 × 18 pdr guns; Forecastle and Quarterdeck: 16–28 × 8 pdr guns and 36 pdr carronades

Couronne was a 74-gun Téméraire-class ship of the line built for the French Navy during the 1810s. Completed in 1825, she played a minor role in the Crimean War of 1854–1855.

== Description ==
Designed by Jacques-Noël Sané, the Téméraire-class ships had a length of 55.87 metres (183 ft 4 in), a beam of 14.46 metres (47 ft 5 in) and a depth of hold of 7.15 metres (23 ft 5 in). The ships displaced 3,069 tonneaux and had a mean draught of 7.15 metres (23 ft 5 in). They had a tonnage of 1,537 port tonneaux. Their crew numbered 705 officers and ratings during wartime. They were fitted with three masts and ship rigged.

The muzzle-loading, smoothbore armament of the Téméraire class consisted of twenty-eight 36-pounder long guns on the lower gun deck and thirty 18-pounder long guns on the upper gun deck. After about 1807, the armament on the quarterdeck and forecastle varied widely between ships with differing numbers of 8-pounder long guns and 36-pounder carronades. The total number of guns varied between sixteen and twenty-eight. The 36-pounder obusiers formerly mounted on the poop deck (dunette) in older ships were removed as obsolete.

== Construction and career ==
Couronne was ordered on 20 February 1812, laid down on 15 October 1813 at the Arsenal de Brest and launched on 26 August 1824. The ship was completed the following year and commissioned on 23 February 1830. Couronne took part in the Invasion of Algiers in 1830. She was later renamed Barricade, and Duperré after Admiral Duperré's death. The ship participated in the Crimean War. On 22 July 1854, she ran aground off Åland, Grand Duchy of Finland but was undamaged. She was refloated with the assistance of HMS Driver and HMS Hecla. Couronne was towed to Saigon, French Indo-China, in 1861 and became the flagship of the naval forces there. The ship was stricken on 17 August 1869 and broken up in January 1870.

== Bibliography ==
- Roche, Jean-Michel (2005). Dictionnaire des bâtiments de la flotte de guerre française de Colbert à nos jours [Dictionary of French Warships from Colbert to Today]. Vol. 1: 1671-1870. Roche. ISBN 978-2-9525917-0-6. OCLC 165892922.
- Winfield, Rif and Roberts, Stephen S. (2015) French Warships in the Age of Sail 1786-1861: Design, Construction, Careers and Fates. Seaforth Publishing. ISBN 978-1-84832-204-2
