= French ship Pacificateur =

Pacificateur may refer to:

- French ship Pacificateur (1804), a Téméraire-class 74-gun ship of the line
- French ship Pacificateur (1811), a Bucentaure-class 80-gun ship of the line
