= Neapolitan ship Capri (1810) =

- Scale model of Achille, sister ship of Neapolitan ship Capri (1810), on display at the Musée national de la Marine in Paris.

History

Kingdom of the Two Sicilies
- Name: Capri
- Builder: Castellamare di Stabia
- Laid down: Late 1808
- Launched: 21 August 1810
- Fate: Broken up 1847

General characteristics
- Class & type: Téméraire-class ship of the line
- Displacement: 3,069 tonneaux
- Tons burthen: 1,537 port tonneaux
- Length: 55.87 m (183 ft 4 in) (172 French feet)
- Beam: 14.90 m (48 ft 11 in) (44 French feet 6 French inches)
- Draught: 7.26 m (23 ft 10 in) (22 French feet)
- Propulsion: Up to 2,485 m^{2} (26,750 sq ft) of sails
- Complement: 678 men
- Armament: 74 guns: Lower gundeck: 28 × 36-pounder long guns; Upper gundeck: 30 × 24-pounder long guns; Forecastle and quarter deck: 16 × 8-pounder long guns; 4 × 36-pounder carronades
- Armour: Timber

The Capri was a Téméraire-class 74-gun ship of the line of the Real Marina of the Kingdom of the Two Sicilies.

== Career ==
Capri was built by engineers Jean-François Lafosse and Philippe Greslé after plans by Sané. In April 1815, she was seized by the British, but returned to Napoli in December 1815. She was broken up in 1847.
