= French ship Montebello =

Two ships of the French Navy have borne the name Montebello

- French ship Montebello (1812), an Océan-class ship of the line
- French ship Montebello (1815), a Téméraire-class ship of the line
