= Couronne =

Couronne (pl.: Couronnes) is a French word meaning crown. It may refer to:

== Places in France ==
- La Couronne, Charente, a municipality in the Charente department, Poitou-Charentes
- La Couronne, Bouches-du-Rhône, a village of Martigues, in the Bouches-du-Rhône department, Provence-Alpes-Côte d'Azur
- Grand-Couronne, a municipality in the Seine-Maritime department, Upper Normandy
- Grande Couronne, the outer geographical region of the urban agglomeration of Paris
- Canton of Grand-Couronne, a canton in the Seine-Maritime department, Upper Normandy
- Petit-Couronne, a municipality in the Seine-Maritime department, Upper Normandy
- Petite Couronne, the inner geographical region of the urban agglomeration of Paris
- Couronnes station, a metro station of Paris

== Transport ==
- French ship Couronne, the name of 13 French ships
