= Neapolitan ship Gioacchino (1812) =

Gun ship of the Kingdom of the Two Sicilies

- Scale model of Achille, sister ship of Neapolitan ship Gioacchino (1812), on display at the Musée national de la Marine in Paris.

History

Kingdom of the Two Sicilies
- Name: Gioacchino
- Builder: Castellamare di Stabia
- Laid down: September 1810
- Launched: 1 August 1812
- Completed: May 1813
- Fate: Sold for breaking up 1820

General characteristics
- Class & type: Téméraire-class ship of the line
- Displacement: 3,069 tonneaux
- Tons burthen: 1,537 port tonneaux
- Length: 55.87 m (183 ft 4 in) (172 French feet)
- Beam: 14.90 m (48 ft 11 in) (44' 6")
- Draught: 7.26 m (23 ft 10 in) (22 French feet)
- Propulsion: Up to 2,485 m^{2} (26,750 sq ft) of sails
- Complement: 678 men
- Armament: 74 guns: Lower gundeck: 28 × 36-pounder long guns; Upper gundeck: 30 × 24-pounder long guns; Forecastle and quarter deck: 16 × 8-pounder long guns; 4 × 36-pounder carronades
- Armour: Timber

The Gioacchino was a 74-gun Téméraire-class ship of the line of the Real Marina of the Kingdom of the Two Sicilies.

== Career ==
Gioacchino was built by engineers Jean-François Lafosse and Philippe Greslé after plans by Sané. In April 1815, she was seized by the British, but returned to Napoli in December 1815, where she served as San Fernando. In May 1820, an accidental fire damaged her beyond repair and she was sold for breaking up.

=== References ===
- Demerliac, Alain (2004). La Marine du Consulat et du Premier Empire: Nomenclature des Navires Français de 1800 à 1815 (in French). Éditions Ancre. p. 76. ISBN 2-903179-30-1.
