= French ship Montebello (1815) =

Ship of the line of the French Navy

- Scale model of Achille, sister ship of French ship Montebello (1815), on display at the Musée national de la Marine in Paris.

History

France
- Name: Montebello
- Namesake: Battle of Montebello
- Builder: Venetian Arsenal
- Laid down: December 1810
- Fate: Captured by Austria, 20 April 1814

Austria
- Name: Cesare
- Launched: 7 November 1815
- Out of service: 1816
- Fate: Scrapped shortly after 1824

General characteristics
- Class & type: petit Téméraire-class ship of the line
- Displacement: 2,781 tonneaux
- Tons burthen: 1,381 port tonneaux
- Length: 53.97 m (177 ft 1 in)
- Beam: 14.29 m (46 ft 11 in)
- Draught: 6.72 m (22.0 ft)
- Depth of hold: 6.9 m (22 ft 8 in)
- Sail plan: Full-rigged ship
- Crew: 705
- Armament: 74 guns: Lower gun deck: 28 × 36 pdr guns; Upper gun deck: 30 × 18 pdr guns; Forecastle and Quarterdeck: 20–26 × 8 pdr guns & 36 pdr carronades

Montebello was a 74-gun petite Téméraire-class ship of the line built for the French Navy during the 1810s. Launched in 1813, she played a minor role in the Napoleonic Wars.

== Background and description ==
Montebello was one of the petit modèle of the Téméraire class that was specially intended for construction in some of the shipyards in countries occupied by the French, where there was less depth of water than in the main French shipyards. The ships had a length of 53.97 metres (177 ft 1 in), a beam of 14.29 metres (46 ft 11 in) and a depth of hold of 6.9 metres (22 ft 8 in). The ships displaced 2,781 tonneaux and had a mean draught of 6.72 metres (22 ft 1 in). They had a tonnage of 1,381 port tonneaux. Their crew numbered 705 officers and ratings during wartime. They were fitted with three masts and ship rigged.

The muzzle-loading, smoothbore armament of the Téméraire class consisted of twenty-eight 36-pounder long guns on the lower gun deck and thirty 18-pounder long guns on the upper gun deck. The petit modèle ships ordered in 1803–1804 were intended to mount sixteen 8-pounder long guns on their forecastle and quarterdeck, plus four 36-pounder obusiers on the poop deck (dunette). Later ships were intended to have fourteen 8-pounders and ten 36-pounder carronades without any obusiers, but the numbers of 8-pounders and carronades actually varied between a total of 20 to 26 weapons.

== Construction and career ==
Montebello was laid down in December 1810 at the Venetian Arsenal under supervision of engineers Jean Tupinier and Jean Dumonteil and was renamed Duquesne later that same month. She may have been launched in November 1813 and used as a floating battery in the defence of Venice. Still under construction, 22/24 completed, Montebello was surrendered to Austria at the fall of Venice. The Austrians completed the construction and commissioned her in the Austrian Navy as Cesare. In 1816, she was found to have rotten timber. A commission examined her in 1820. She still existed in 1824. Cesare was eventually broken up shortly after 1824 and before 1835.

A detailed 1/20th model of Montebello is on display at the Museo Storico Navale.
