= French ship Pacificateur (1804) =

Ship of the line of the French Navy

- Scale model of Achille, sister ship of French ship Pacificateur (1804), on display at the Musée national de la Marine in Paris.

History

France
- Name: Pacificateur
- Namesake: "Peacemaker"
- Builder: Brest
- Laid down: May 1801
- Fate: Broken up on stack 1804

General characteristics
- Class & type: Téméraire-class ship of the line
- Displacement: 3,069 tonneaux
- Tons burthen: 1,537 port tonneaux
- Length: 55.87 m (183.3 ft) (172 French feet)
- Beam: 14.90 m (48.9 ft) (44' 6")
- Draught: 7.26 m (23.8 ft) (22 French feet)
- Propulsion: Up to 2 485 m² of sails
- Complement: 678 men
- Armament: 74 guns: Lower gundeck: 28 × 36-pounder long guns; Upper gundeck: 30 × 24-pounder long guns; Forecastle and Quarter deck: 16 × 8-pounder long guns; 4 × 36-pounder carronades
- Armour: Timber

The Pacificateur was a 74-gun Téméraire-class ship of the line built for the French Navy during the first decade of the 19th century.

== Career ==
Pacificateur was started at Brest in May 1801, under the supervision of engineer Antoine Geoffroy and after plans by Sané. In 1804, recurrent difficulties in bringing construction timber to Brest, compounded by a criminal fire at the arsenal in February, led Bonaparte to order all construction ceased there.
