= French ship Apollon (1788) =

Ship of the line of the French Navy

- Scale model of Achille, sister ship of French ship Apollon (1788), on display at the Musée national de la Marine in Paris.

History

France
- Name: Apollon
- Namesake: Apollo, Gasparinus de Bergamo, François Séverin Marceau-Desgraviers
- Builder: Rochefort
- Laid down: April 1787
- Launched: 21 May 1788
- Commissioned: 1788
- Decommissioned: 1797
- Renamed: Gasparin in February 1794; Apollon on 16 May 1795; Marceau on 6 June 1798
- Fate: Broken up 1798

General characteristics
- Class & type: Téméraire-class ship of the line
- Displacement: 3,069 tonneaux
- Tons burthen: 1,537 port tonneaux
- Length: 55.87 m (183 ft 4 in)
- Beam: 14.46 m (47 ft 5 in)
- Draught: 7.15 m (23.5 ft)
- Depth of hold: 7.15 m (23 ft 5 in)
- Sail plan: Full-rigged ship
- Crew: 705
- Armament: 74 guns: Lower gun deck: 28 × 36 pdr guns; Upper gun deck: 30 × 18 pdr guns; Forecastle and Quarterdeck: 16 × 8 pdr guns

Apollon was a 74-gun Téméraire-class ship of the line built for the French Navy during the 1780s. Completed in 1785, she played a minor role in the French Revolutionary Wars.

== Description ==
The Téméraire-class ships had a length of 55.87 metres (183 ft 4 in), a beam of 14.46 metres (47 ft 5 in) and a depth of hold of 7.15 metres (23 ft 5 in). The ships displaced 3,069 tonneaux and had a mean draught of 7.15 metres (23 ft 5 in). They had a tonnage of 1,537 port tonneaux. Their crew numbered 705 officers and ratings during wartime. They were fitted with three masts and ship rigged.

The muzzle-loading, smoothbore armament of the Téméraire class consisted of twenty-eight 36-pounder long guns on the lower gun deck, thirty 18-pounder long guns and thirty 18-pounder long guns on the upper gun deck. On the quarterdeck and forecastle were a total of sixteen 8-pounder long guns. Beginning with the ships completed after 1787, the armament of the Téméraires began to change with the addition of four 36-pounder obusiers on the poop deck (dunette). Some ships had instead twenty 8-pounders.

== Construction and career ==
Apollon was laid down at the Arsenal de Rochefort in April 1787. The ship was launched about 21 May 1788 and completed later that year. In 1790, Apollon was the flagship of Charles Louis du Chilleau de La Roche, in Brest. Between 1791 and 1793, she was based in Saint-Domingue. The ship participated in the French expedition to Sardinia. During the Siege of Toulon, her commanding officer, Captain Imbert, negotiated the surrender of the town with Admiral Hood aboard HMS Victory. After the siege, Apollon ferried 1,500 anti-revolutionary prisoners to Rochefort, where most of them were executed. She took part in the battle of the Glorious First of June, and the Croisière du Grand Hiver ("Campaign of the Great Winter") in 1794–1795. The ship was eventually broken up on 6 June 1798.
