= French ship Éole (1789) =

Ship of the line of the French Navy

- Scale model of Achille, sister ship of French ship Éole (1789), on display at the Musée national de la Marine in Paris.

History

France
- Name: Éole
- Namesake: Aeolus
- Builder: Lorient
- Laid down: 1 June 1787
- Launched: 15 November 1789
- Commissioned: August 1790
- Fate: Broken up in Baltimore in 1816

General characteristics
- Class & type: Téméraire-class ship of the line
- Displacement: 3,069 tonneaux
- Tons burthen: 1,537 port tonneaux
- Length: 55.87 m (183 ft 4 in)
- Beam: 14.46 m (47 ft 5 in)
- Draught: 7.15 m (23.5 ft)
- Depth of hold: 7.15 m (23 ft 5 in)
- Sail plan: Full-rigged ship
- Crew: 705
- Armament: 74 guns: Lower gun deck: 28 × 36 pdr guns; Upper gun deck: 30 × 18 pdr guns; Forecastle and Quarterdeck: 16 × 8 pdr guns

Éole was a 74-gun Téméraire-class ship of the line built for the French Navy during the 1780s. Completed in 1790, she played a minor role in the French Revolutionary Wars.

== Description ==
The Téméraire-class ships had a length of 55.87 metres (183 ft 4 in), a beam of 14.46 metres (47 ft 5 in) and a depth of hold of 7.15 metres (23 ft 5 in). The ships displaced 3,069 tonneaux and had a mean draught of 7.15 metres (23 ft 5 in). They had a tonnage of 1,537 port tonneaux. Their crew numbered 705 officers and ratings during wartime. They were fitted with three masts and ship rigged.

The muzzle-loading, smoothbore armament of the Téméraire class consisted of twenty-eight 36-pounder long guns on the lower gun deck, thirty 18-pounder long guns and thirty 18-pounder long guns on the upper gun deck. On the quarterdeck and forecastle were a total of sixteen 8-pounder long guns. Beginning with the ships completed after 1787, the armament of the Téméraires began to change with the addition of four 36-pounder obusiers on the poop deck (dunette). Some ships had instead twenty 8-pounders.

== Construction and career ==
Éole was laid down at the Arsenal de Lorient on 2 June 1787 and named 25 August. The ship was launched on 15 November 1789 and completed in August 1790. Between 1791 and 1793, she was based in Saint-Domingue. Éole took part in the Glorious First of June in 1794, where she and Trajan dismasted HMS Bellerophon. The ship later took part in the French expedition to Ireland in 1796. On 19 August 1806, during the Atlantic campaign of 1806, she was dismasted by a tempest off Martinique, and had to be taken in tow by American ships to Annapolis. She was eventually condemned in 1811, and sold for scrap.

== Bibliography ==
- Roche, Jean-Michel (2005). Dictionnaire des bâtiments de la flotte de guerre française de Colbert à nos jours [Dictionary of French Warships from Colbert to Today]. Vol. 1: 1671-1870. Roche. ISBN 978-2-9525917-0-6. OCLC 165892922.
- Winfield, Rif and Roberts, Stephen S. (2015) French Warships in the Age of Sail 1786-1861: Design, Construction, Careers and Fates. Seaforth Publishing. ISBN 978-1-84832-204-2
