= Gun Smoke =

Gun smoke or gunsmoke refers to the smoke produced by a firearm. It may also refer to:

== Film and TV ==
- Gunsmoke, an American radio and television drama
- Gun Smoke (1931 film), a Western
- Gun Smoke (1936 film), a Western
- Gun Smoke (1945 film), a Western
- Gunsmoke (film), a 1953 Western

== Music ==
- Gunsmoke (Dogbowl and Kramer album), a 1996 album by Dogbowl and Kramer
- Gunsmoke (Texas Hippie Coalition album), a 2024 album by Texas Hippie Coalition

== Other ==
- Gunsmoke (aerial gunnery competition), a biennial air-to-surface gunnery meet hosted by the United States Air Force
- Gun Smoke, a 1975 electro-mechanical game shooting game
- Gun.Smoke, a 1985 arcade game
