= Téméraire-class ship of the line =

1782 class of French third-rate ships of the line

- Scale model of Achille, a typical French seventy-four of the Téméraire class at the beginning of the 19th century.

Class overview
- Name: Téméraire
- Builders: Toulon, Rochefort, Brest, Lorient, Antwerp, Genoa, Amsterdam, Cherbourg, Flushing, Venice
- Operators: French Navy; Royal Navy; Spanish Navy; Royal Netherlands Navy
- Preceded by: Centaure class
- Succeeded by: Tonnant class
- Subclasses: Téméraire (18 ships); Duquesne (46 ships); Danube (26 ships); Cassard (Large variant - 2 ships); Suffren (Short variant - 3 ships); Pluton (Small variant - 25 ships)
- In commission: 1782 (Téméraire)–1862 (Couronne)
- Planned: 120
- Completed: 107
- Canceled: 13

General characteristics
- Type: Ship of the line
- Displacement: 3,069 tonneaux
- Tons burthen: 1,537 port tonneaux
- Length: 55.87 metres (183.3 ft) (172 pied)
- Beam: 14.90 metres (48 ft 11 in) (44.5 pied)
- Draught: 7.26 metres (23.8 ft) (22 pied)
- Propulsion: Up to 2,485 m^{2} (26,750 sq ft) of sails
- Complement: 700 men
- Armament: Main deck: 28 × 36-pounder (French units of weight) (16 kg); Upper deck: 30 × 18-pounders; two ships were fitted with 24-pounders instead of 18-pounders on this deck (see 'Large Variant' below); Forecastle and quarterdeck: 16 × 8-pounders; 4 × 36 pdr (16 kg) carronades

The Téméraire-class ships of the line were a class of a hundred and twenty 74-gun ships of the line ordered between 1782 and 1813 for the French navy or its attached navies in dependent (French-occupied) territories. Although a few of these were cancelled, the type was and remains the most numerous class of capital ship ever built to a single design.

The class was designed by Jacques-Noël Sané in 1782 as a development of the Annibal and her near-sister Northumberland, both of which had been designed by him and built at Brest during the 1777-1780 period. Some thirteen ships were ordered and built to this new design from 1782 to 1785, and then the same design was adopted as a standard for all subsequent 74-gun ships (the most common type of ship of the line throughout the period from ca. 1750 to 1830) built for the French Navy during the next three decades as part of the fleet expansion programme instituted by Jean-Charles de Borda in 1786. The design was appreciated in Britain, which eagerly commissioned captured ships (18 in total) and even copied the design with the Pompée and America class.

Under the 1814 Treaty of Paris, eight ships from the Pluton (or 'Small Model') group were ceded to the Royal Netherlands Navy in August 1814. Some of these ships served in the Dutch until the 1830s. Even after 1825 Dutch naval yards continued to build another six ships based on the original design, but with modifications according to Seppings like a rounded transom and closed bow. The last of these was struck off charge as late as 1913: the Piet Heyn of 1833, which was heavily modified as the steam frigate Admiraal van Wassenaer after 1856.

== Variants from basic design ==
While all the French 74-gun ships from the mid-1780s until the close of the Napoleonic Wars were to the Téméraire design, there were three variants of the basic design which Sané developed with the same hull form of Téméraire. In 1793 two ships were laid down at Brest to an enlarged design; in 1801 two ships were commenced at Lorient with a slightly shorter length than the standard design (with a third ship commenced at Brest but never completed); and in 1803 two ships were commenced at Toulon to a smaller version (many more ships to this 'small(er) model' were then built in the shipyards controlled by France in Italy and the Netherlands) - these are detailed separately below.

== Ships in class ==
=== Téméraire group (18 ships) ===
Name	Builder	Ordered	Laid down	Launched	Completed	Fate
Téméraire	Brest shipyard	15 Feb 1782	May 1782	17 December 1782	July 1783	Condemned, November 1801. Broken up, 1803.
Audacieux	Lorient shipyard	15 Feb 1782	July 1782	28 October 1784	1785	Condemned, November 1802. Broken up, 1803.
Superbe	Brest shipyard	15 Feb 1782	July 1782	11 November 1784	1785	Wrecked off Brest, 30 Jan 1795.
Généreux	Rochefort shipyard	15 Feb 1782	July 1782	21 June 1785	October 1785	Captured by the Royal Navy at Toulon in August 1793, but retaken by the French in December 1793; captured again by the Royal Navy in February 1800 and served as HMS Généreux. Broken up in 1816.
Commerce de Bordeaux, renamed Bonnet Rouge in Jan 1794 and then Timoléon in February 1794.	Toulon shipyard	1784	September 1784	15 September 1785	1786 or 1787	Destroyed in action at the Battle of the Nile, August 1798.
Ferme, renamed Phocion in October 1792.	Brest shipyard	1784	December 1784	16 September 1785	1786	Surrendered to Spain by her officers at Trinidad in Jan 1793.
Fougueux	Lorient shipyard	1782	August 1782, but work stopped in Feb 1783 and she was demolished. Laid-down again November 1784.	19 September 1785	Late 1785	Captured by the Royal Navy at Trafalgar on 21 October 1805, and subsequently wrecked.
Patriote	Brest shipyard	1784	September 1784	3 October 1785	April 1786	Condemned in May 1820 and became Pontoon No.4 in April 1821. (Note: Note: The French Ponton can mean a floating walkway, dock, barge, or ship used for storage, accommodation, or even as a prison hulk.) Broken up at Rochefort in late 1832.
Commerce de Marseille, renamed Lys in July 1786 and then Tricolore in October 1792.	Toulon shipyard	1784	September 1784	7 October 1785	September 1787	Captured by the Royal Navy at Toulon in August 1793, then destroyed during the Siege of Toulon in December 1793.
Borée, renamed Ça Ira in April 1794 and then Agricola in June 1794.	Lorient shipyard	1784	Jan 1783, but work stopped in Feb 1783 and she was demolished. Laid down again in November 1784.	17 November 1785	August 1787	Broken up at Rochefort, 1803.
Orion, renamed Mucius Scaevola in November 1793, then Mucius in same month.	Rochefort shipyard	1782	October 1784	18 April 1787	1788	Condemned 1802, and broken up 1803–04.
Léopard	Brest shipyard	1785	October 1785	22 June 1787	July 1787	Wrecked and then burnt, Feb 1793.
Entreprenant	Lorient shipyard		May 1786	11 October 1787	1788	Broken up, 1803.
Impétueux	Rochefort shipyard		July 1786	25 October 1787	1788	Captured by the Royal Navy, 1 June 1794. Accidentally destroyed by fire, 24 August 1794.
Apollon, renamed Gasparin in Feb 1794, reverted to Apollon in May 1794; renamed Marceau in December 1797.	Rochefort shipyard		April 1787	21 May 1788	1788	Broken up, 1798.
América	Brest shipyard		End of 1786	21 May 1788	1789	Captured by the Royal Navy, 1 June 1794, and served as HMS Impétueux. Broken up, 1813.
Duguay-Trouin	Brest shipyard		End of 1786	30 October 1788	July 1790	Destroyed during the Siege of Toulon, December 1793.
Aquilon	Rochefort shipyard		September 1787	8 June 1789	June 1790	Captured by Britain during the Battle of the Nile on 2 August 1798. Served as HMS Aboukir until broken up in Plymouth in 1802.

=== Duquesne group (46 ships) ===
Name	Builder	Ordered	Laid down	Launched	Completed	Fate
Duquesne	Toulon shipyard		August 1787	2 September 1788	1789	Captured by the Royal Navy on 24 July 1803, and served as HMS Duquesne. Broken up in 1805.
Tourville	Lorient shipyard		June 1787	16 December 1788	July 1790	Decommissioned on 26 October 1833. Broken up at Brest, 1841.
Éole	Lorient shipyard		June 1787	15 November 1789	August 1790	Broken up in Baltimore, 1816.
Jupiter, renamed Montagnard in March 1794, Démocrate on 18 May 1795, then back to Jupiter again on 30 May 1795, and to Batave in December 1797.	Brest shipyard	19 August 1787	June 1788	4 November 1789	October 1790	Broken up in Brest, 1807.
Vengeur	Brest shipyard		23 May 1788	16 December 1789	August 1790	Ran aground, 12 December 1792. Abandoned, and finally sank, 8 June 1793.
Jean Bart	Lorient shipyard			7 November 1790		Wrecked at the Battle of the Basque Roads on 26 Feb 1809, hull burnt by the British in April.
Scipion	Toulon shipyard			30 July 1790		Captured by the British at Toulon in August 1793, commissioned with a crew of French Royalist rebels under British command, burnt by accident at Livorno on 28 November 1793.
Thésée, renamed Révolution on 7 Jan 1793, then Finisterre on 5 Feb 1803.	Rochefort shipyard			14 April 1790		Broken up, 1816.
Pyrrhus, renamed Mont-Blanc in 1793, and Trente-et-un Mai in 1794. Renamed Républicain in 1795, then Mont-Blanc again in 1796.	Rochefort shipyard			13 August 1791		Captured by the Royal Navy during the Battle of Cape Ortegal, 4 November 1805. Served as HMS Mont Blanc. Used as a gunpowder hulk from 1811, and sold in 1819.
Suffren, renamed Redoutable, May 1795.	Brest shipyard			31 May 1791		Participated in the Battle of Trafalgar, taken by the British, foundered two days later, 22 October 1805.
Thémistocle	Lorient shipyard			12 September 1791		Burnt by the Royal Navy at the Siege of Toulon, 18 December 1793.
Trajan, renamed Gaulois.	Lorient shipyard			24 Jan 1792		Decommissioned, June 1802. Broken up, 1805.
Nestor, renamed Cisalpin in 1797, and Aquilon in 1803.	Brest			22 July 1793		Grounded and burnt at the Battle of the Basque Roads, April 1809
Pompée	Toulon shipyard			28 May 1791		Captured at Toulon by the Royal Navy, 29 August 1793. Served as HMS Pompee. Converted to prison hulk at Portsmouth, 1816. Broken up, Jan 1817.
Tigre	Brest			8 May 1793		Captured by the Royal Navy during the Battle of Groix, 23 June 1795. Served as HMS Tigre. Broken up, June 1817.
Tyrannicide, renamed Desaix in August 1800.	Lorient			28 June 1793		Wrecked at Saint-Domingue, Jan 1802.
Barra, renamed Pégase in 1795, and Hoche in 1797.	Toulon shipyard			23 March 1794		Captured by the Royal Navy on 12 October 1798. Served as HMS Donegal. Broken up, 1845.
Droits de l'Homme	Lorient shipyard			29 May 1794		Driven ashore by HMS Amazon and Indefatigable and wrecked on 14 Jan 1797.
Jemmapes	Rochefort			22 Jan 1794		Decommissioned, May 1820.
Lion, renamed Marat in 1794, Formidable in May 1795.	Rochefort			29 April 1794		Captured by the Royal Navy at the Battle of Groix, 23 June 1795, served as HMS Belleisle. Broken up in 1814.
Wattignies	Lorient	3 July 1793		8 October 1794		Scrapped, 1808.
Cassard, renamed Dix-août in 1798, Brave in Feb 1803.	Lorient	16 Feb 1793		2 May 1795		Captured by HMS Donegal during the Battle of San Domingo, 6 Feb 1806. Foundered, 12 April 1806.
Jean-Jacques Rousseau, renamed Marengo on 2 December 1802.	Toulon			21 July 1795		Captured by the Royal Navy in the action of 13 March 1806, and served as HMS Marengo until broken up 1816.
Viala, renamed Voltaire in 1795, Constitution in 1795, and Jupiter in 1803.	Lorient			28 September 1795		Captured by the Royal Navy during the Battle of San Domingo, 6 Feb 1806, and served as HMS Maida. Sold for breaking up, 1814.
Hercule	Lorient			5 October 1797		Captured by HMS Mars during the Battle of the Raz de Sein on 21 April 1798, and served as HMS Hercules. Broken up in December 1810.
Spartiate	Toulon			24 November 1797		Captured by the Royal Navy during the Battle of the Nile, 2 August 1798. Served as HMS Spartiate. Broken up, 1857.
Argonaute	Lorient			22 December 1798		Exchanged with Spain, 1806.
Quatorze Juillet	Lorient			1 Feb 1798		Destroyed by accidental fire before being commissioned.
Impétueux, launched as Brutus and renamed before completion	Lorient	31 May 1798	August 1798	24 Jan 1803	March 1803	Beached and set ablaze by the British in the Chesapeake, 14 September 1806.
Union, renamed Diomède in 1803.	Lorient			1 August 1799		Ran aground and wrecked during the Battle of San Domingo, 6 Feb 1806. Burnt by the Royal Navy, 8 Feb 1806.
Aigle	Rochefort			6 July 1800		Captured by the Royal Navy at Trafalgar on 21 October 1805. Retaken by her crew on 22 October 1805, but sank in a heavy storm the next day.
Duguay-Trouin (ii)	Rochefort			24 March 1800		Captured by the Royal Navy in the Battle of Cape Ortegal, 4 November 1805, and served as HMS Implacable. Renamed HMS Foudroyant, 1943. Scuttled, 2 December 1949.
Héros	Rochefort			10 May 1801		Captured by Spain at Cadiz, June 1808.
Scipion (ii)	Lorient			29 March 1801		Captured by the Royal Navy at the Battle of Cape Ortegal, 4 November 1805. Served as HMS Scipion until broken up in Jan 1819.
Magnanime	Rochefort			18 August 1803		Decommissioned, 1816.
Achille	Rochefort			17 November 1804		Sunk at the battle of Trafalgar, 22 October 1805.
Lion	Rochefort			12 Jan 1804		Ran aground and burnt, 26 October 1809.
Régulus	Lorient			12 April 1805		Burnt by crew to avoid capture, 7 April 1814.
Ajax	Rochefort			17 June 1806		Decommissioned, 1816.
Courageux	Lorient			3 Feb 1806		Broken up, 1831.
D'Hautpoul	Lorient			2 September 1807		Captured by the Royal Navy on 17 April 1809 during Troude's expedition to the Caribbean. Served as HMS Abercrombie. Sold, 1817.

Téméraire-class ships
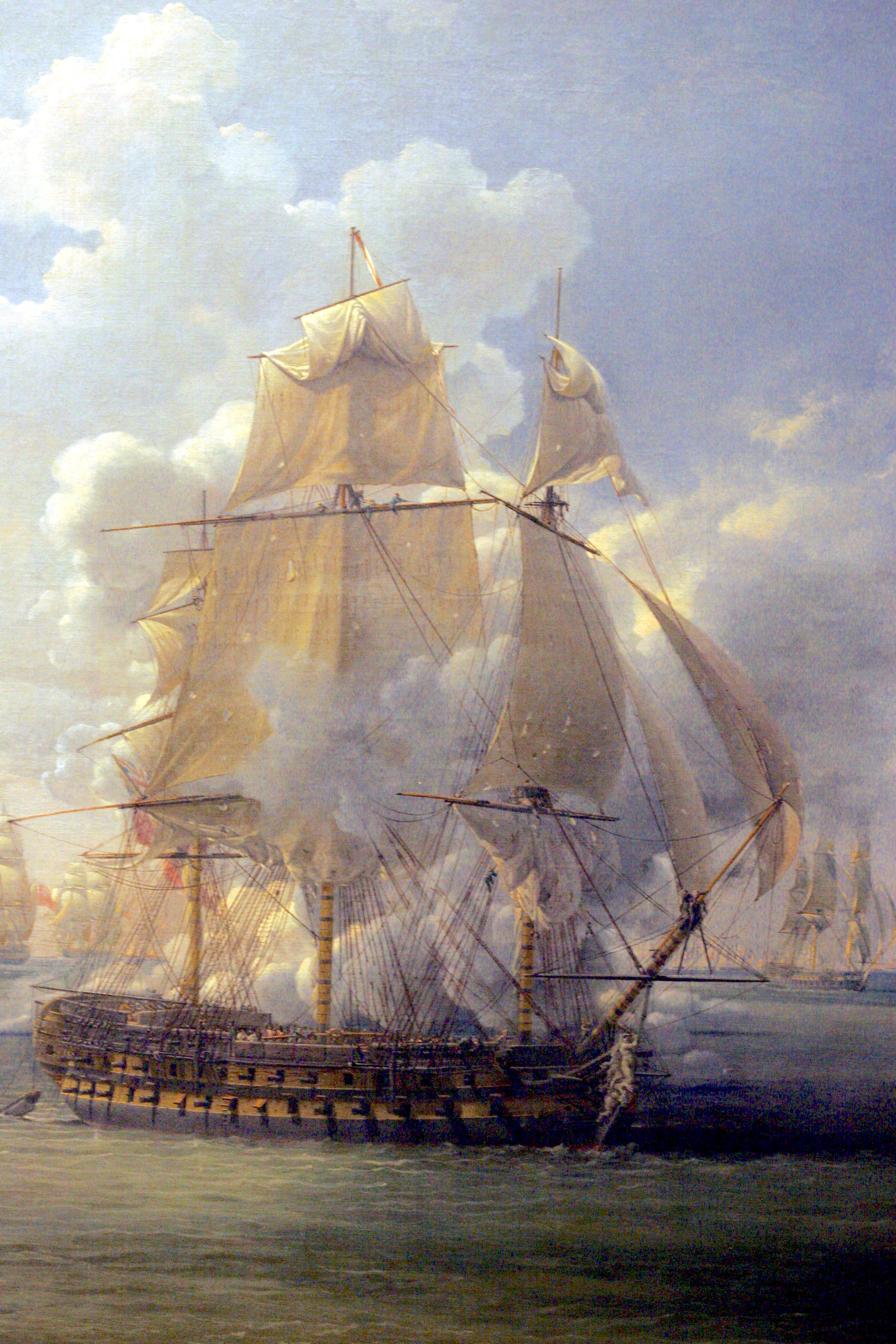
Fight of the Poursuivante against the British ship HMS Hercules, 28 June 1803

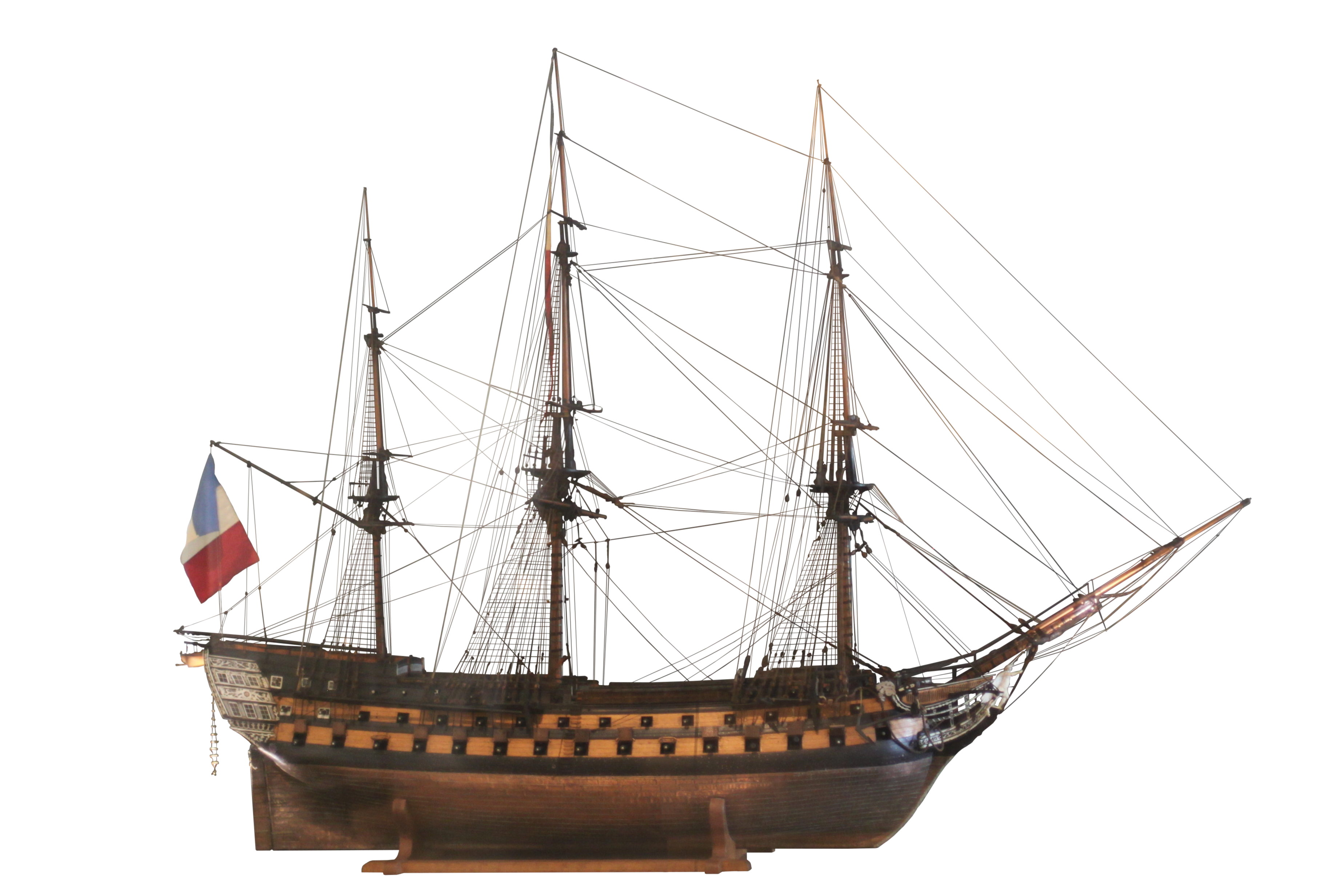
A model of the Triomphant

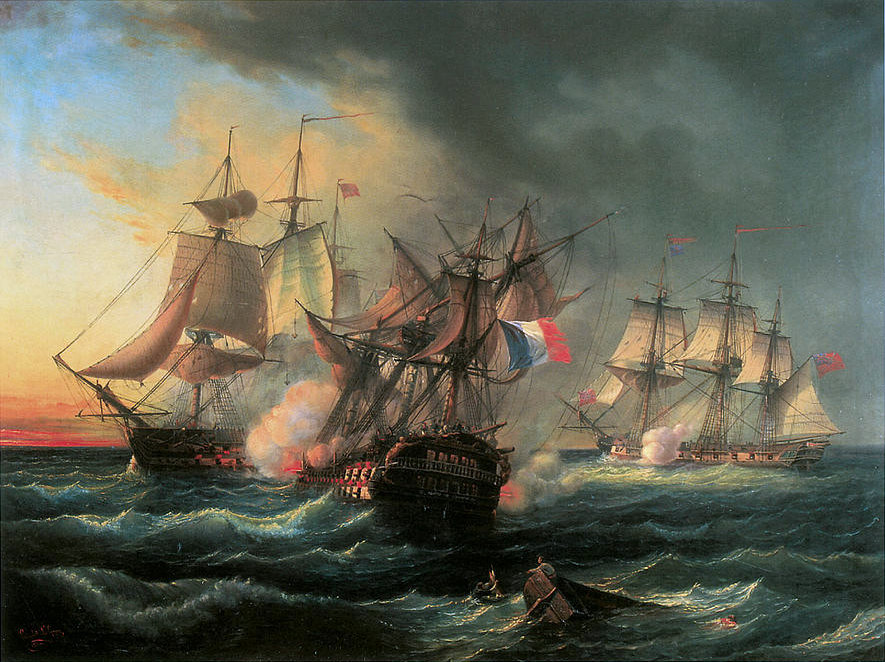
Battle between the French warship Droits de l'Homme and the British frigates Amazon (right) and Indefatigable (left), 13 & 14 January 1797.

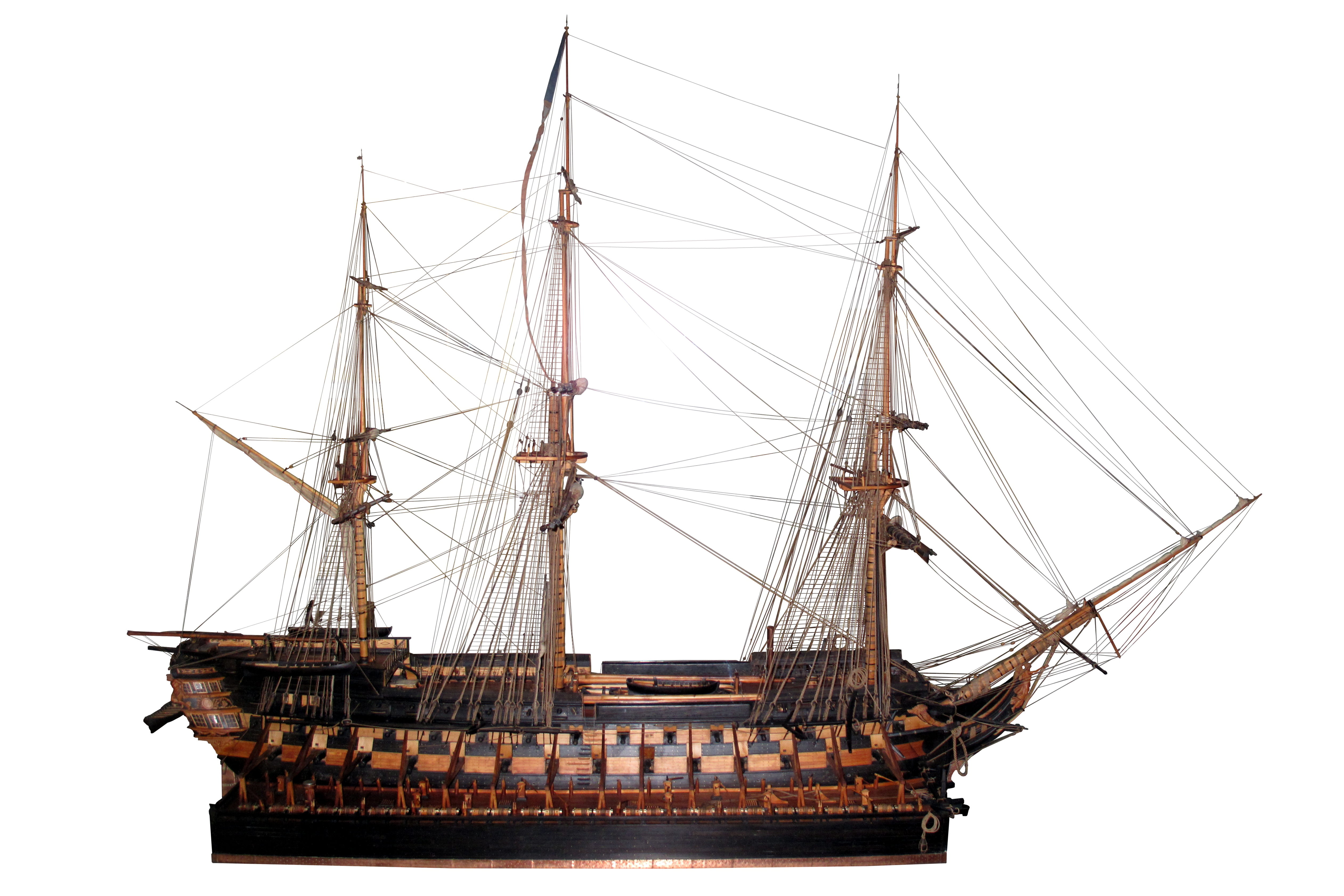
Rivoli, fitted with the camels that allowed her to cross the shallow banks before Venice harbour.

=== Danube Group (26 ships) ===
Name	Builder	Ordered	Laid down	Launched	Completed	Fate
Polonais, renamed Lys in April 1814, reverted to Polonais from March until July 1815, then Lys again.	Lorient		August 1805	27 May 1808	October 1808	Broken up at Brest, 1825.
Tonnerre, renamed, Quatorze Juillet in 1795, but launched under her original name.	Brest		16 April 1794	9 June 1808	September 1808	Wrecked during the Battle of the Basque Roads on 12 April 1809, and burned by her crew to avoid capture.
Triomphant	Rochefort			31 March 1809		Converted to a pontoon, 1828.
Danube	Toulon		June 1807	21 December 1808	August 1809	Converted to a pontoon, 1828.
Ulm	Rochefort			25 May 1809		Converted to a pontoon, 1822.
Golymin	Lorient			8 December 1809		Wrecked off Brest, 23 March 1814.
Nestor (ii)	Brest			21 May 1810		Struck, 1849
Marengo, renamed Pluton in 1866.	Lorient			12 October 1810		Struck, 21 July 1858. Prison hulk from 1860 to 1865. Broken up in 1873.
Trident	Toulon			9 June 1811		Struck, 24 November 1857. Used as a barracks hulk from 1857 to 1869. Broken up in 1879.
Trajan	Antwerp			15 August 1811		Struck, 1826.
Agamemnon, razeed and renamed Amphitrite in 1823.	Genoa			23 Feb 1812		Converted to a pontoon, 1836.
Gaulois	Antwerp			14 April 1812		Converted to a pontoon, 1826. Broken up, 1831.
Romulus, razeed and renamed Guerrière in 1821.	Toulon			31 May 1812		Broken up, 1840.
Ville de Marseille	Toulon			15 August 1812		Struck, 22 June 1858, and used as a barracks hulk. Broken up in Toulon, 1877.
Scipion (iii)	Genoa			5 September 1813		Struck, 1846.
Orion (ii)	Brest			9 October 1813		Scrapped, 1841.
Duguay-Trouin (ii)	Cherbourg			10 November 1813		Struck, and used as a floating magazine from 1824.
Colosse, razeed and renamed Pallas in 1821.	Toulon			5 December 1813		Struck, 1831. Broken up, 1840.
Superbe (ii)	Antwerp		December 1808	5 July 1814	September 1814	Lost, 1833.
Brillant	Genoa		Feb 1812. Captured by the British, 18 April 1814.	18 April 1815 for the British Navy as HMS Genoa	1815	Broken up at Plymouth, 1838.
Hercule (ii), renamed Provence in July 1815, then Alger in July 1830.	Toulon		September 1812	26 May 1815	August 1815	Struck, 31 December 1855, and used as a hospital ship. Broken up, 1881.
Duc de Berry, renamed Glorieux before launch, Minerve in 1834, Aber Wrac'h in 1865.	Rochefort		Jan 1812	18 June 1818	July 1818	Razeed to 58-gun frigate during 1831–34. Struck, and converted to a pontoon, 1853. Broken up, 1874.
Jean Bart (ii)	Lorient-Caudan		July 1811	25 August 1820	December 1820	Broken up, 1833
Triton	Rochefort		April 1813	22 September 1823	December 1824	Converted to a pontoon, 1852. Broken up, 1870.
Couronne (ii), renamed Duperré in December 1849.	Brest		October 1813	26 August 1824	1825	Broken up, 1870.
Généreux (ii)	Cherbourg		July 1813	23 September 1831	1832	Broken up, 1865.

Three further ships to this design were begun at Castellammare di Stabia for the "puppet" Neapolitan Navy of Joachim Murat. Two were launched but the third ship, laid down at Castellammare di Stabia in September 1812, was never named, let alone launched, as its construction was abandoned following the defection of the Kingdom of Naples from the Napoleonic cause in November 1813.

Name	Builder	Begun	Launched	Completed	Fate
Capri	Castellammare di Stabia	End of 1808	21 August 1810	Jan 1812	Out of service 1847, and broken up.
Gioacchino	Castellammare di Stabia	September 1810	1 August 1812	May 1813	Damaged by fire, 10 May 1820. Sold for breaking up, 1821.

=== Large Variant (Cassard group – 2 ships launched) ===
Two ships were laid down in 1793–1794 at Brest to a variant of Sané's design with the aim of carrying 24-pounder guns on the upper deck instead of the 18-pounders carried by the Téméraire. These ships were two feet longer than the standard 74s, and half a foot wider. The first was begun as the Lion, but was renamed Glorieux in 1795 and Cassard in 1798. The second was begun as the Magnanime, but was renamed Quatorze Juillet in 1798 and Vétéran in 1802. Unlike the main sequence, construction proceeded slowly. By 1816 the 24-pounders aboard these two ships had been replaced by 18-pounders, and no further ships to this variant design were produced, so indicating that it was not judged successful.

Name	Builder	Begun	Launched	Completed	Fate
Vétéran	Brest shipyard	November 1794	18 July 1803	December 1803	Condemned, 1833.
Cassard	Brest shipyard	August 1793	24 September 1803	December 1803	Condemned, 1818.

=== Short Variant (Suffren group – 2 ships launched) ===
Two ships were begun in 1801 to a variation of the standard Téméraire design by Sané to meet the demands of Pierre-Alexandre Forfait. The length of these ships were reduced by 65 cm from the standard design. A third ship to this variant design begun at Brest was cancelled in 1804. After Forfait left the Ministry of the Marine in October 1801, no further vessels were ordered to this variant design.

Name	Builder	Begun	Launched	Completed	Fate
Suffren	Lorient shipyard	August 1801	17 September 1803	October 1803	Condemned, 1815.
Algésiras	Lorient shipyard	August 1801	8 July 1804	September 1804	Captured by the British at Trafalgar in 1805, but retaken. Captured by Spain at Cadiz, June 1808.
Pacificateur	Brest shipyard	May 1801	Never launched	-	Cancelled, Feb 1804.

=== Small Variant (Pluton group – 24 ships launched) ===
Starting with the prototypes Pluton and Borée in 1803, a smaller version of the Téméraire class, officially named petit modèle, was designed by Jacques-Noël Sané to be produced in shipyards having a lesser depth of water than the principal French shipyards, primarily those in neighbouring states under French control and in foreign ports which had been absorbed into the French Empire such as Antwerp. The revised design measured 177 feet 7 inches on the waterline, 180 feet 1 inch on the deck, and 46 feet 11 inches moulded breadth. The depth of hull was 9 inches less than that in the "regular" Téméraire design. In addition to those below, two more 74s to the "petit modèle" design were ordered in June 1803, one at Marseille and the other at Bordeaux, but these were not built.

Name	Builder	Ordered	Laid down	Launched	Completed	Fate
Pluton	Toulon shipyard	June 1803	August 1803	17 Jan 1805	March 1805.	Captured by the Spanish at Cadiz in June 1808.
Borée	Toulon shipyard	June 1803	August 1803	27 June 1805	August 1805	Condemned at Toulon in 1827.
Génois	Genoa shipyard		July 1803	17 August 1805	November 1805	Condemned at Rochefort in August 1821, and broken up there by October 1821.
Royal Hollandais	Flushing shipyard				Captured on the stocks after the fall of Flushing during the Walcheren Campaign in 1809. Frames taken to England, where she was assembled and launched as HMS Chatham in 1812.	
Commerce de Lyon	Antwerp shipyard		November 1803	9 April 1807	March 1808	Condemned at Brest in Feb 1819, and broken up there in December 1819.
Charlemagne	Antwerp shipyard		April 1804	8 April 1807	March 1808	Ceded to the Royal Netherlands Navy on 1 August 1814, renamed Nassau.
Anversois, renamed Éole in August 1814, then Anversois in March 1815 and back to Éole in July 1815.	Antwerp shipyard		June 1804	7 June 1807	March 1808	Condemned at Brest in Feb 1819 and broken up there in December 1819.
Duguesclin	Antwerp shipyard		July 1804	20 June 1807	March 1808	Condemned at Lorient in June 1818, and broken up there in Jan 1820.
César	Antwerp shipyard			21 June 1807		Ceded to the Royal Netherlands Navy on 1 August 1814, renamed Prins Frederik in 1814, broken up 1821
Ville de Berlin, renamed Thésée before launch, renamed Atlas after 1814.	Antwerp shipyard			6 September 1807		Condemned 1819, hulked.
Audacieux, renamed Pulstuck before launch, corrected to Pultusk by decree of Napoleon 1809.	Antwerp shipyard			20 September 1807		Ceded to the Royal Netherlands Navy on 1 August 1814, renamed to Holland in 1814, broken up 1817
Illustre, named Dantzick before launching, and renamed Achille in 1814 during the First Restoration. In 1815, during the Hundred Days, reverted to Dantzick, but returned to Achille on the Second Restoration.	Antwerp shipyard			15 August 1807		Struck, 1816.
Albanais	Antwerp shipyard		April 1807	2 October 1808	April 1809	Ceded to the Royal Netherlands Navy on 1 August 1814, renamed to Batavier in 1814, broken up 1817
Breslaw (originally named Superbe, but renamed before launching)	Genoa shipyard	Jan 1806		3 May 1808	August 1808	Struck, 1836.
Dalmate, renamed Hector in 1814 during the First Restoration. In 1815, during the Hundred Days, reverted to Dalmate, but returned to Hector on the Second Restoration.	Antwerp shipyard		August 1806	21 August 1808	April 1809	Struck, 1819.
Rivoli	Venice shipyard			6 September 1810		Captured by HMS Victorious in the action of 22 February 1812. Served as HMS Rivoli until broken up in 1819.
Montebello	Venice shipyard			7 November 1815		Ceded to Austria, broken up 1824.
Mont Saint-Bernard	Venice shipyard			1811		Struck, 1814.
Régénérateur	Venice shipyard			1811		Ceded to Austria, razeed into frigate, broken up 1831.
Audacieux	Amsterdam shipyard		8 May 1812	5 October 1816	1 Feb 1820	Ceded to the Royal Netherlands Navy on 1 August 1814, renamed to Coalitie and completed by the United Kingdom of the Netherlands, renamed to Wassenaar at launch. Flagship of the Dutch Mediterranean Escadre 1820–1824. Foundered and destroyed on 16 Jan 1827 at Schoorl (NL) en route to the Netherlands East Indies as troop transport.
Castiglione	Venice shipyard			1812		Struck, 1814.
Polyphème	Amsterdam shipyard		1812	July 1817	1817	Ceded to the Royal Netherlands Navy on 1 August 1814, renamed to Holland and completed by the United Kingdom of the Netherlands. Flagship of the Dutch Mediterranean Escadre 1824–1828. Struck 1832.
Royal Italien	Venice shipyard			1812		Ceded to Austria, razeed into frigate, broken up 1838.
Couronne	Amsterdam shipyard		1811	1817	December 1813	Ceded to the Royal Netherlands Navy on 1 August 1814, renamed to Willem de Eerste and completed by the United Kingdom of the Netherlands. Flagship of the Dutch Mediterranean Escadre 1817–1820. Struck 1829.
Piet Hein	Rotterdam shipyard		1812	15 August 1812	October 1812	Ceded to the Royal Netherlands Navy on 1 August 1814, renamed to Admiraal Piet Hein and completed by the United Kingdom of the Netherlands. Struck 1819.
Montenotte	Venice shipyard			1815		Completed by Lombardy–Venetia.
Arcole	Venice shipyard			Not launched		Cancelled.
Lombardo	Venice shipyard			Not launched		Cancelled.
Semmering	Venice shipyard			Not launched		Cancelled.
Citoyen	Trieste shipyard	December 1811		Not launched		Cancelled, 1812.

== See also ==
- French ship Téméraire for a list of ships so named in the French Navy
