= Obusier de vaisseau =

French light naval artillery used c. 1787–1805

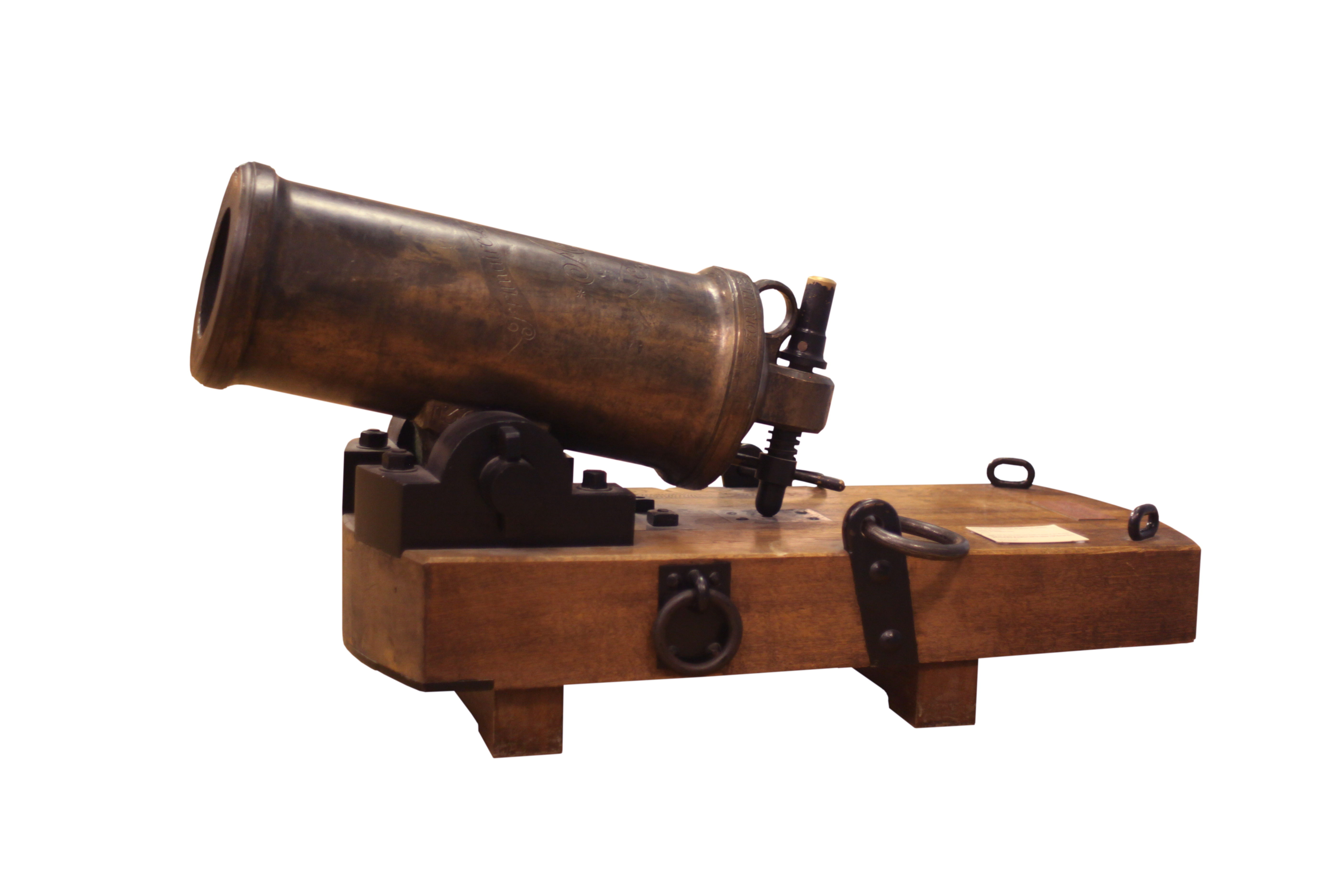
- An obusier de vaisseau found in the wreck of Golymin
- Type: naval gun
- Place of origin: France

Service history
- In service: 1787–1804
- Used by: France; Two Sicilies

Production history
- Produced: 1787

Specifications
- Barrel length: 85 cm
- Crew: 5
- Shell weight: 36 lb (16 kg)
- Calibre: 36-pounder

The obusier de vaisseau was a light piece of naval artillery with a large calibre mounted on French warships of the Age of Sail. Designed to fire explosive shells at a low velocity, they were an answer to the carronade in the close combat and anti-personnel role. However, their intended ammunition proved too dangerous for the crew, and the French Navy phased them out in 1804 in favour of the carronade.

Accounts by British warships of the armament of captured French ships tend to describe them as carronades. However, when the description includes the remark that the weapon was brass, this suggests that it was an obusier. Several of the guns were recovered from the wreck of the Golymin in the road of Brest, and are now on display at the Musée national de la Marine in Paris and in Brest.
