= French ship Achille (1804) =

Ship of the line of the French Navy

- Scale model on display at the Musée de la Marine in Paris

History

France
- Name: Achille
- Namesake: Achilles
- Builder: Arsenal de Rochefort
- Laid down: 5 November 1802
- Launched: 17 November 1804
- Completed: February 1805
- Commissioned: 28 January 1805
- Fate: Sunk, 21 October 1805

General characteristics
- Class & type: Téméraire-class ship of the line
- Displacement: 3,069 tonneaux
- Tons burthen: 1,537 port tonneaux
- Length: 55.87 m (183.3 ft) (172 pied)
- Beam: 14.90 m (48 ft 11 in)
- Draught: 7.26 m (23.8 ft) (22 pied)
- Propulsion: Up to 2,485 m^{2} (26,750 sq ft) of sails
- Armament: 74 muzzle-loading, smoothbore guns: Lower gun deck: 28 × 36 pdr guns; Upper gun deck: 30 × 18 pdr guns; Forecastle and quarterdeck: 16 × 8 pdr guns and 4 × 36-pounder carronades

Achille was a 74-gun Téméraire-class ship of the line built for the French Navy in the first decade of the 19th century. Completed in 1805, she played a minor role in the Napoleonic Wars. The ship participated in the Trafalgar campaign that same year, including the Battle of Cape Finisterre in July and was destroyed during the Battle of Trafalgar in October when her magazine exploded. At least 190 members of her crew were rescued. The recovery of one woman from the ship was the inspiration for a painting in 1817.

== Description ==
Designed by Jacques-Noël Sané, the Téméraire-class ships had a length of 55.87 metres (183 ft 4 in), a beam of 14.46 metres (47 ft 5 in) and a depth of hold of 7.15 metres (23 ft 5 in). The ships displaced 3,069 tonneaux and had a mean draught of 7.15 metres (23 ft 5 in). They had a tonnage of 1,537 port tonneaux. Their crew numbered 705 officers and ratings during wartime. They were fitted with three masts and ship rigged.

The muzzle-loading, smoothbore armament of the Téméraire class consisted of twenty-eight 36-pounder long guns on the lower gun deck and thirty 18-pounder long guns on the upper gun deck. On the quarterdeck and forecastle were a total of sixteen 8-pounder long guns. Beginning with the ships completed after 1787, the armament of the Téméraires began to change with the addition of four 36-pounder obusiers on the poop deck (dunette). By the time of the Battle of Trafalgar in October 1805, Achille was fitted with eighteen 8-pounders and 4 or 6 obusiers.

== Construction and career ==
Achille was laid down at the Arsenal de Rochefort by the Crucy Brothers for 64,000 francs on 8 July 1802. The ship was launched on 17 November 1804, commissioned by Captain (Capitaine de vaisseau) Louis Gabriel Deniéport on 28 January 1805 and completed the following month. She sailed to the West Indies on 1 May from Rochefort with her half-sister Algésiras where they joined a French fleet under Vice-Admiral Pierre-Charles Villeneuve on 29 May.

=== Battle of Trafalgar ===
Artist's conception of the situation at noon as Royal Sovereign was breaking into the Franco-Spanish line. The depiction of Nelson's northern column is incorrect as he aimed much closer to the leading ships, before turning south and paralleling the Franco-Spanish line before turning east towards the French flagship, the 86-gun Bucentaure.

Having fought the inconclusive Battle of Cape Finisterre on 22 July against a British fleet that attempted to intercept his combined Franco-Spanish fleet returning from the West Indies, Villeneuve decided to disobey his orders to rendezvous with the French ships at Brest because his ships needed repairs and many crewmen were sick, Achille's sick list alone numbered 200 men. He put into the nearest friendly port, Vigo, Spain. Unhappy with the inability of the Spanish dockyards in Galicia to repair his ships and influenced by the Spanish commander, Admiral Federico Gravina, who had secret orders not to allow his ships to go to Brest, Villeneuve decided to head south to the largest concentration of Spanish ships on the Atlantic coast, and arrived at Cádiz on 20 August.

Before the Battle of Trafalgar began on 21 October, Achille was assigned to the Squadron of Observation under the overall command of Gravina, although Rear Admiral Charles Magon retained command of half of the squadron. Villeneuve initially ordered Magon to sortie on 18 October and engage the British frigates keeping watch on Cádiz, but countermanded his order when he was informed that some of Vice-Admiral Horatio Nelson's ships had been spotted at Gibraltar. Believing that he now had a sufficient superiority of numbers to defeat the British, Villeneuve now ordered the combined fleet to prepare to sail, but the winds did not cooperate. Magon's ships were able to leave the Bay of Cádiz on the morning tide on 19 October, but the rest of the fleet was only able to enter the bay. Villeneuve spent the next day generally heading west while Magon's ship pursued the frigates, Héros getting close enough to fire a broadside at Sirius before being ordered to fall back on the fleet at the end of the day. Once night fell, they could see British signal lights and flares at a distance that they estimated to be only two miles away. Villeneuve ordered his ships to form line of battle and then ordered a turn to the south east. In the darkness, these commands were more than the inexperienced crews could easily handle and the combined fleet could only form into several ragged lines. When dawn broke, Villeneuve saw that Nelson had put his ships in a position threaten his rear; Villeneuve decided to reverse course to protect his rear and move closer to refuge in Cádiz despite the very light winds that morning. His command ruined whatever semblance of order the combined fleet had, as each ship had to maneuver as best they could, as they each handled differently in the light winds. In addition, many of the bigger ships were driven to the east by the ocean's swell and the south-westerly wind. Villeneuve's neat organization of three divisions, each of seven ships and Gravina's Squadron of Observation as the tactical reserve had been replaced by chaos with ships scattered across the sea.

This maneuver left Achille out of position at the rear of the formation, just behind Gravina's 112-gun flagship, Principe de Asturias. As the ship attempted to pass the flagship to assume her proper place in front of Principe de Asturias, the two ships collided about 1030. Neither ship was damaged and their rigging did not get entangled, so Achille was able to pass the flagship shortly afterward. By the time that Nelson's ships in two columns were approaching the combined fleet around noon, it had shaken itself into a rough curved line, with the Squadron of Observation at the rear of the fleet, although the ships were not evenly spaced apart with large gaps between clusters of ships. Achille was fourth from the rear of the fleet, behind the Spanish 74-gun San Ildefonso and in front of Principe de Asturias.

The 74-gun HMS Revenge was in the middle of the leeward (southern) column. About 1330, Captain Robert Moorsom ordered his ship to breakthrough the gap in the Franco-Spanish battleline between San Ildefonso and Achille, but the latter ship attempted to close the gap and almost pushed Revenge into San Ildefonso, but the British ship's guns shot away Achille's mizzen and main topsails before she could ram Revenge. Nevertheless, the French ship's jibboom ripped away Revenge's own mizzen topsail as she passed close behind the British ship. Deniéport had mustered his crew in preparation to board Revenge and the British guns killed or wounded many of the boarding party. Achille was positioned to rake Revenge's stern at point-blank range for at least half an hour and dismounted three of her guns. Most of the British ship's guns could not bear on Achille, but the carronades on the quarterdeck took a toll on the ship's crew, killing Dénieport and most of the ship's other officers. When Principe de Asturias appeared out of the gunsmoke, Achille was able to disengage. (Note: Sources differ significantly about which ships Achille engaged early in the battle. Naval historian Peter Goodwin credits her with raking the stern of the second ship in the British lee column, Belleisle, about 1:30 and was then supported by the French 74-gun Aigle, the Spanish 74-gun San Justo and the Spanish 64-gun San Leandro in fighting Belleisle for the next two hours. Fremont-Barnes has Achille engage Belleisle after the French 74-gun Fougueux had already collided with the British ship.)

Achille then was able to rake her British namesake, the 74-gun Achille, a few times before the 64-gun Polyphemus arrived. The smaller British ship was able to smash Achille's wheel and knocked down her mizzenmast before manoeuvering to cut off Achille's escape route while continuing to shoot at the French ship. During this time Polyphemous brought down Achille's yard and saw that the top of her foremast was on fire before disengaging. (Note: According to Goodwin, the French ship never engaged the British Achille, but rather remained engaged with Belleisle until she was raked by Swiftsure, which was joined shortly later by Polyphemus. Naval historian Roy Adkins states that the fire was caused by Achille's own soldiers shooting from the ship's rigging and that the ship had been attacked by Swiftsure and Polyphemus, but makes no reference to any engagements with Belleisle or the British Achille.)

The 98-gun Prince, which had been in the rear of the British formation and was the last British ship to open fire, later spotted Achille and fired several broadsides into her, bringing down her remaining masts. Landing amidships, the sails caught on fire and set fire to the ship's boats. The ship's water pumps already having been disabled by British shells, the crew began abandoning ship. Prince, the schooner Pickle, the cutter Entreprenante and the frigate Naiad all sent boats to rescue the French sailors from the water, although the boats made no attempt to close within 200 yards (180 m) of the burning ship until after her magazine exploded around 1730. An officer serving in Defence wrote,

It was a sight the most awful and grand that can be conceived. In a moment the hull burst into a cloud of smoke and fire. A column of vivid flame shot up to an enormous height in the atmosphere and terminated by expanding into an immense globe, representing for a few seconds, a prodigious tree in flames, specked with many dark spots, which the pieces of timber and bodies of men occasioned while they were suspended in the clouds.

The number of survivors is not known, although they numbered at least 190 people, including Jeanne Caunant, who was the wife of one of the sailors. She had been working in the ship's hold as a powder monkey passing up gunpowder from the forward magazine to the lower gundeck, and evacuated Achille by climbing out through a gunport and jumping into the sea. Another woman was rescued by a boat crew from the first rate Britannia, but nothing further is known of her.

== Achille in art ==
The only ship to be destroyed by a magazine explosion during the battle, Achille's demise and its aftermath was a popular subject for British artists. She is included in J. M. W. Turner's The Battle of Trafalgar, a history painting that included several separate events during the battle. The marine artist Richard Brydges Beechey chose to depict Achille's remains sinking under the waves. The marine artist William John Huggins featured the Belleisle in a history painting that showed Achille on fire in the background. It was turned into an engraving by Edward Duncan. The rescue of a female member of her crew named Jeannette after the explosion was the inspiration for the coloured engraving Anecdote At the Battle of Trafalgar. It was engraved by M. Dubourg and coloured by William Heath.

A 1:33 scale model is on display in Paris at the Musée de la Marine.

Achille in art
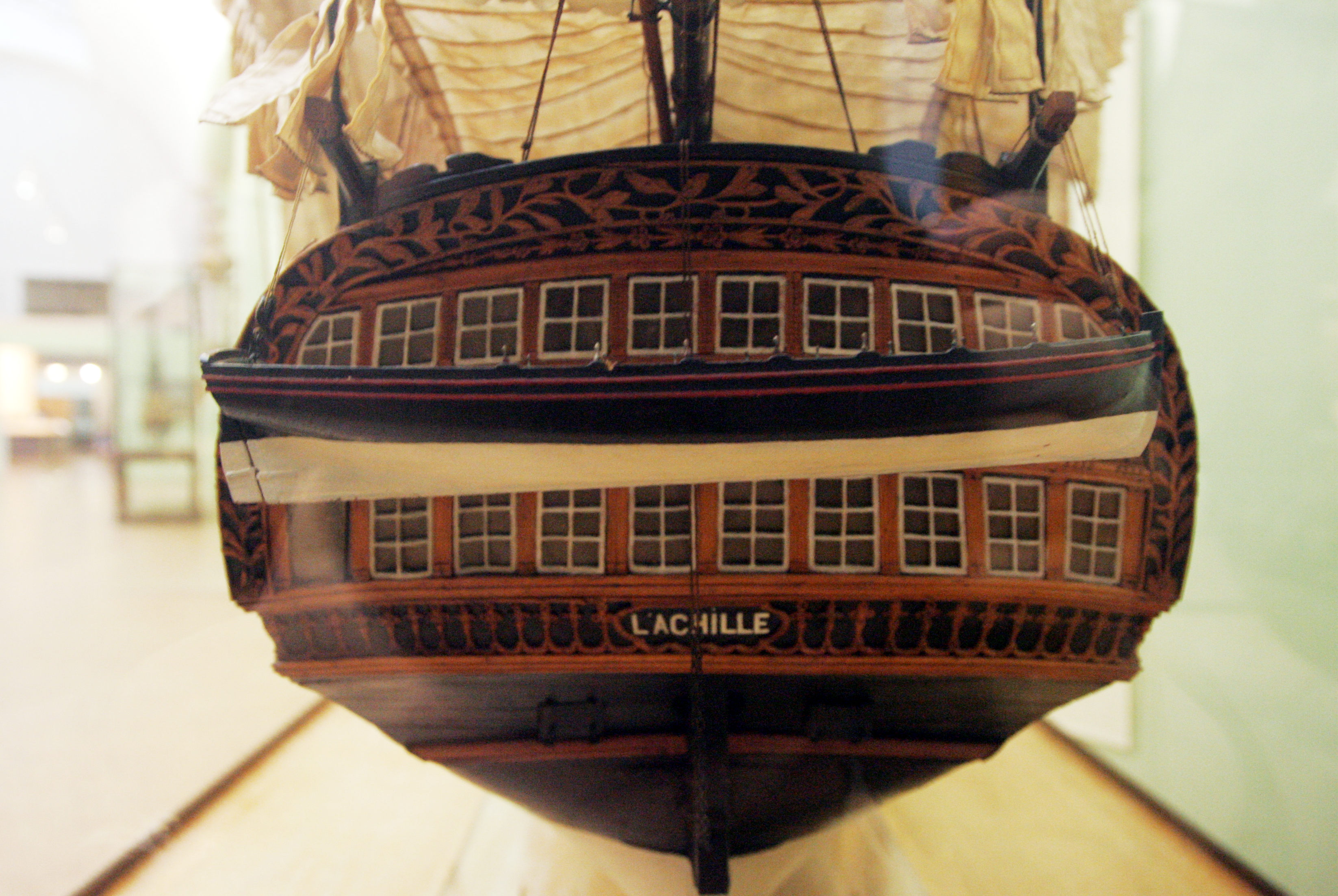
Stern of the model

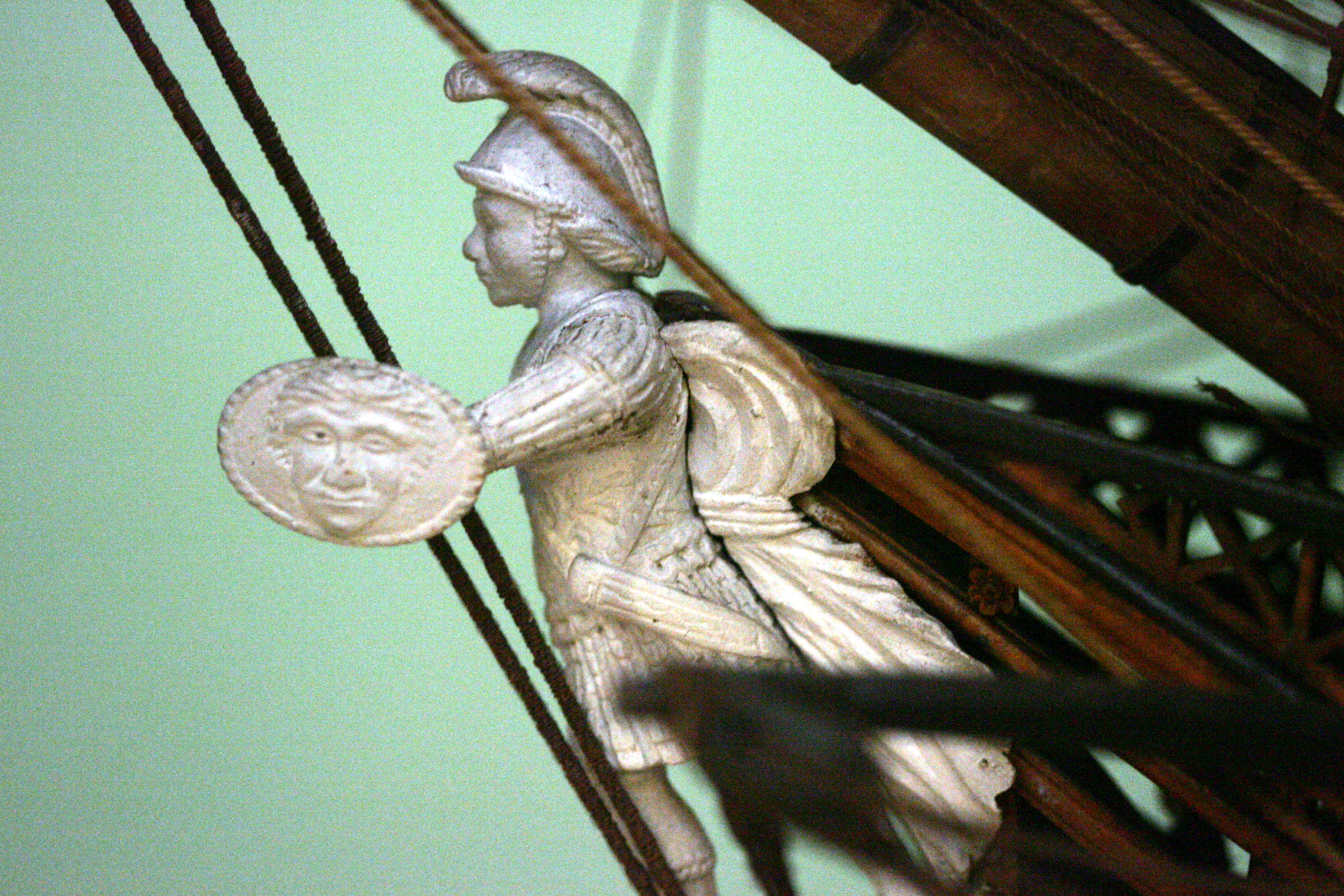
Figurehead of the model

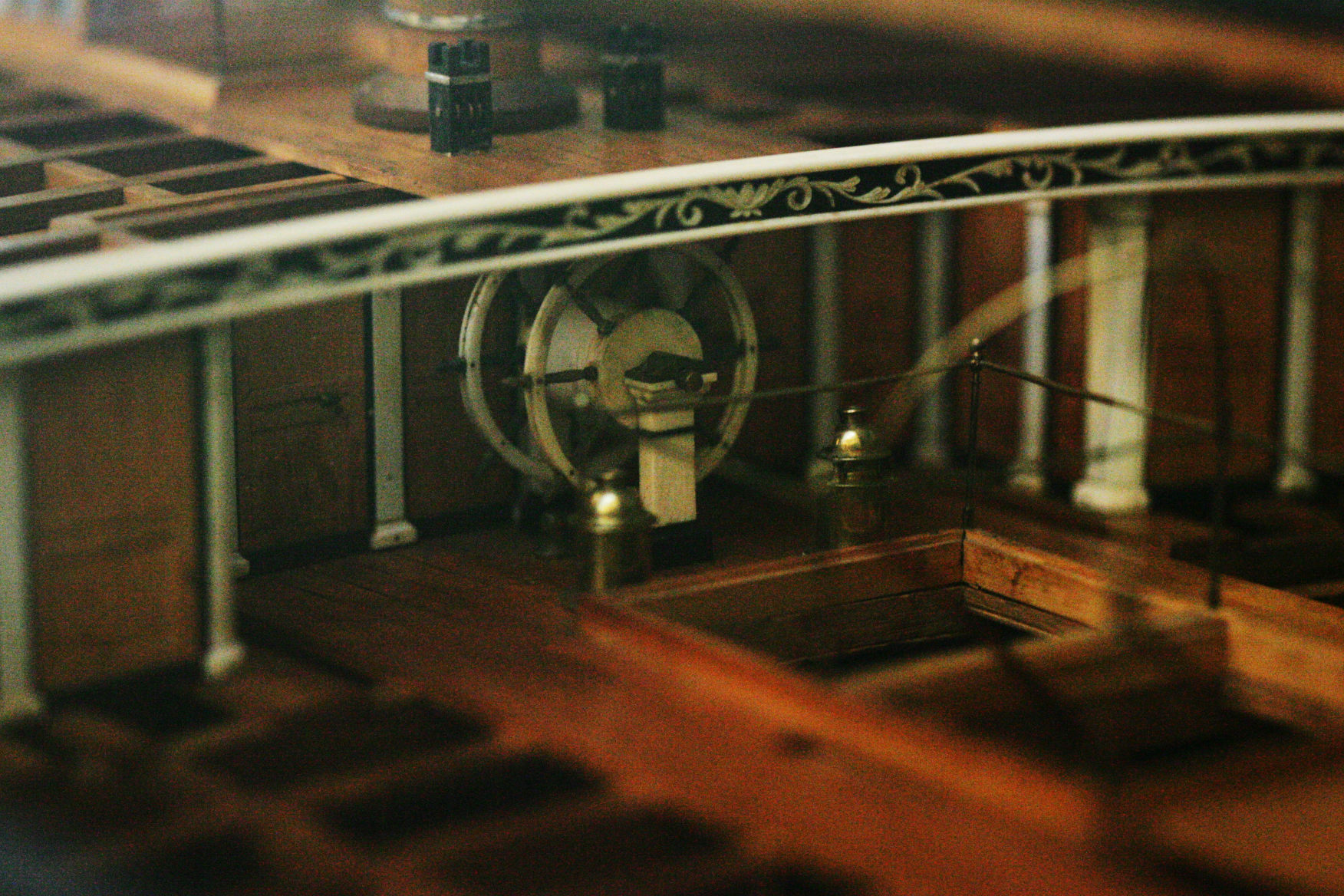
Ship's wheel of the model

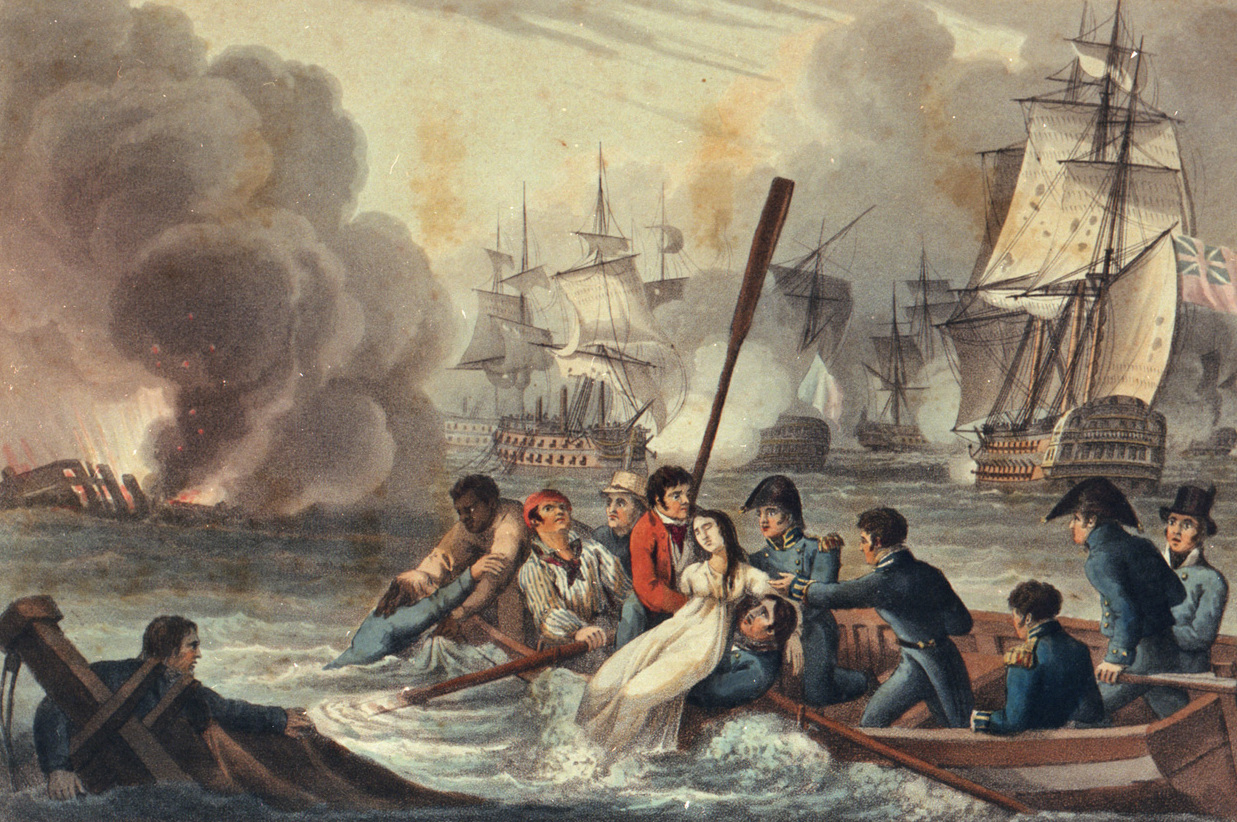
Anecdote At the Battle of Trafalgar

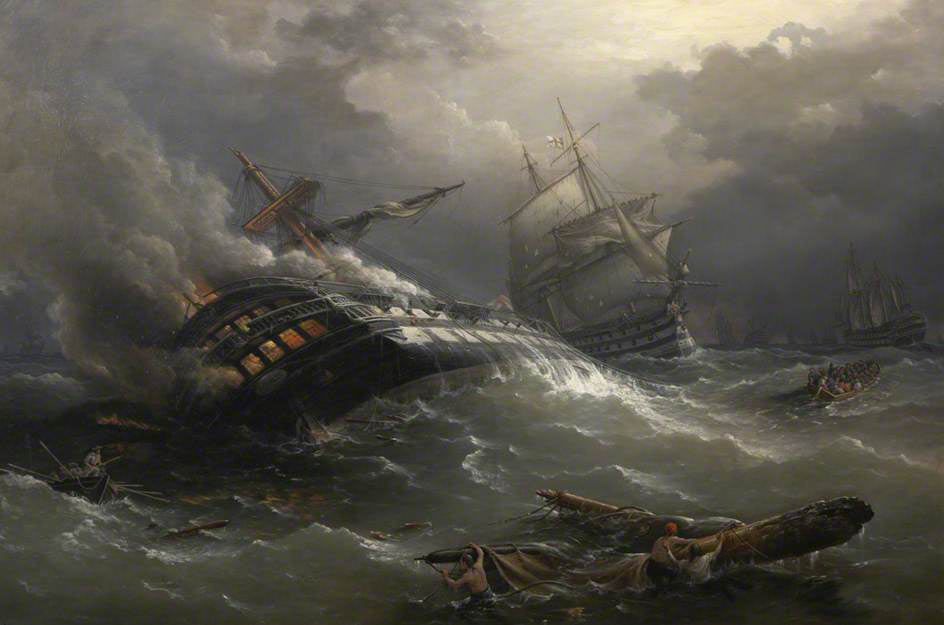
Painting of the sinking of Achille

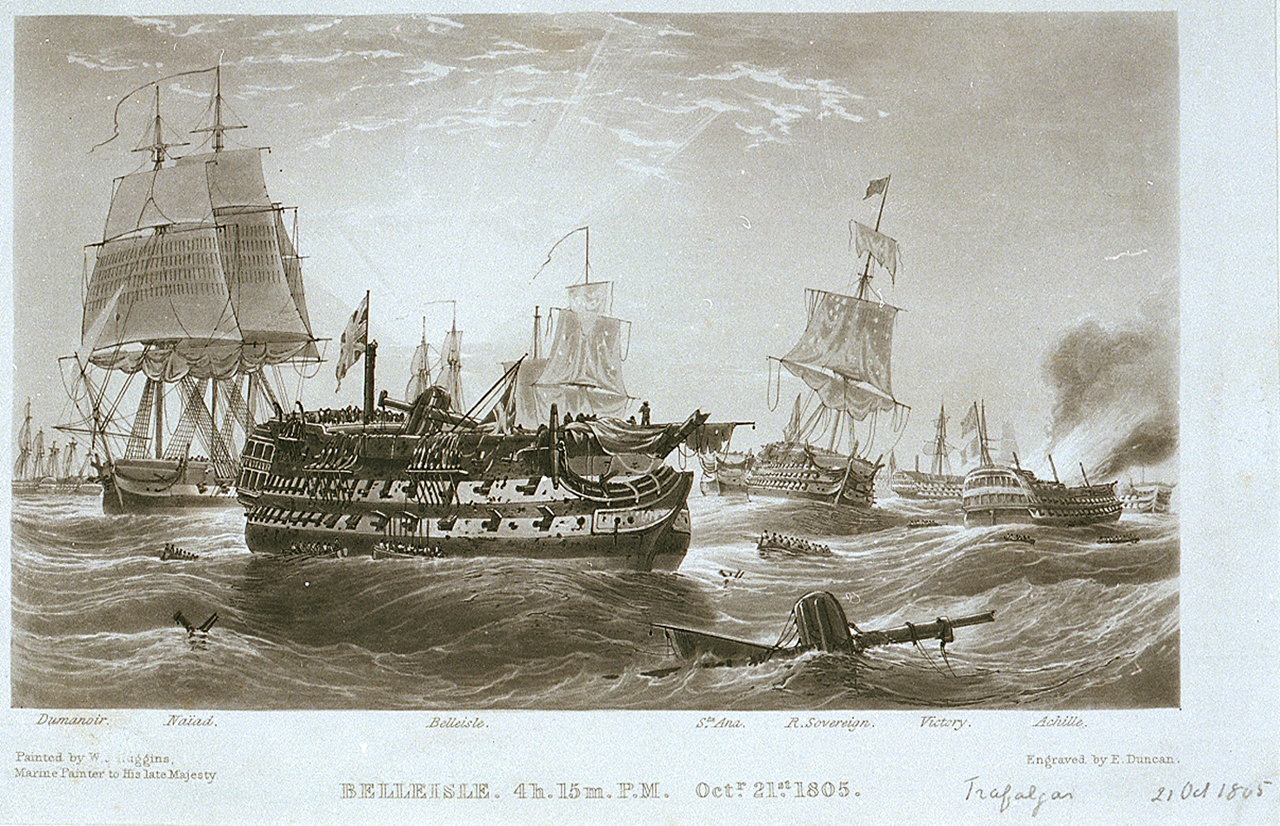
An engraving of HMS Belleisle, showing Achille on fire in the right background
