= List of ship launches in 1691 =

The list of ship launches in 1691 includes a chronological list of some ships launched in 1691.

Date	Ship	Class	Builder	Location	Country	Notes
20 January	Adroit	Fourth rate frigate	Etienne Salicon	Le Havre	Kingdom of France	For French Navy.
January	Victorieux	First rate	Honoré Mallet	Rochefort	Kingdom of France	For French Navy.
February	Entendu	Fourth rate	Jean-Armand Levasseur	Dunkerque	Kingdom of France	For French Navy.
February	San Lorenzo Zustinian	San Lorenzo Zustinian-class ship of the line	Stefano Conti	Venice	Republic of Venice	For Venetian Navy.
5 March	Foudroyant	Foudroyant-class ship of the line	Blaise Pangalo	Brest	Kingdom of France	For French Navy.
21 March	Chester	Fourth rate	Lawrence, Woolwich Dockyard	Woolwich	England	For Royal Navy.
28 March	Leon Coronato	Giove Fulminante-class ship of the line	Iseppo di Piero de Pieri	Venice	Republic of Venice	For Venetian Navy.
29 March	Orgueilleux	First rate		L'Orient	Kingdom of France	For French Navy.
March	Écueil	Third rate	Bertrand Renau d'Elicagaray	Dunkerque	Kingdom of France	For French Navy.
20 April	Supply	Lighter	Chatham Dockyard	Chatham	England	For Royal Navy.
July	Opiniâtre	Fourth rate frigate	Pierre Masson	Rochefort	Kingdom of France	For French Navy.
August	Poli	Fourth rate frigate	Honoré Mallet	Rochefort	Kingdom of France	For French Navy.
10 September	Admirable	First rate	Laurnet Coulomb	L'Orient	Kingdom of France	For French Navy.
20 October	Chatham	Fourth rate	Lee, Chatham Dockyard	Chatham	England	For Royal Navy.
10 November	Sceptre	Sceptre-class ship of the line	François Coulomb	Toulon	Kingdom of France	For French Navy.
19 November	Merveilleux	Foudroyant-class ship of the line	Blaise Pangalo	Brest	Kingdom of France	For French Navy.
4 December	Formidable	Second rate	Etienne Hubac	Brest	Kingdom of France	For French Navy.
17 December	Lys	Sceptre-class ship of the line	François Coulomb	Toulon	Kingdom of France	For French Navy.
date	Juste	Third rate	Etienne Salicon	Le Havre	Kingdom of France	For French Navy.
December	Ambitieux	First rate	Honoré Mallet	Rochefort	Kingdom of France	For French Navy.
December	Fulminant	First rate	Pierre Masson	Rochefort	Kingdom of France	For French Navy.
Unknown date	Banier	Third rate	Amsterdam Naval Yard	Amsterdam	Dutch Republic	For Dutch Republic Navy.
Unknown date	Beschermer	First rate	van Leeuwen	Rotterdam	Dutch Republic	For Dutch Republic Navy.
Unknown date	Centurion	Fourth rate	Harding, Chatham Dockyard	Chatham	England	For Royal Navy.
Unknown date	Delft	Fourth rate	van Leeuwen	Rotterdam	Dutch Republic	For Dutch Republic Navy.
Unknown date	Dreadnought	Third rate	Johnson, Blackwall Yard	Blackwall	England	For Royal Navy.
Unknown date	Eerste Edele	Third rate		Amsterdam	Dutch Republic	For Dutch Republic Navy.
Unknown date	Elswoud	Third rate	Hendrik Cardinaal, Amsterdam Naval Yard	Amsterdam	Dutch Republic	For Dutch Republic Navy.
Unknown date	Enkhuizen	Third rate		Hoorn	Dutch Republic	For Dutch Republic Navy.
Unknown date	Fiere	Unrated galley	Simon Chabert	Marseille	Kingdom of France	For French Navy.
Unknown date	Sirène	Laurier-class ship of the line	Pierre Masson	Bayonne	Kingdom of France	For French Navy.
Unknown date	Trompette	Unrated barque longue	Philippe Cochois	Dunkerque	Kingdom of France	For French Navy.
Unknown date	Saint Esprit	Second rate	Jean Guichard	Rochefort	Kingdom of France	For French Navy.
Unknown date	Invincible	Unrated galley	Simon Chabert	Majorca	Spain	For French Navy.
Unknown date	Middelburg	Second rate		Vlissingen	Dutch Republic	For Dutch Republic Navy.
Unknown date	Monnikendam	Second rate		Hoorn	Dutch Republic	For Dutch Republic Navy.
Unknown date	Neptunus	Privateer frégate légère	Pieter Wiederbuner	Ostend	(Spain) Spanish Netherlands	For Michel Mansfelt.
Unknown date	Norwich	Fourth rate	Portsmouth Dockyard	Portsmouth	England	For Royal Navy.
Unknown date	Oost Stellingwerf	Fourth rate	Hendrik Cardinaal, Amsterdam Naval Yard	Amsterdam	Dutch Republic	For Dutch Republic Navy.
Unknown date	Ridderschap	Second rate	van Leeuwen	Rotterdam	Dutch Republic	For Dutch Republic Navy.
Unknown date	Ripperda	Fourth rate	Hendrik Cardinaal, Amsterdam Naval Yard	Amsterdam	Dutch Republic	For Dutch Republic Navy.
Unknown date	Rotterdam	Second rate	van Leeuwen	Rotterdam	Dutch Republic	For Dutch Republic Navy.
Unknown date	Stad Medemblik	Third rate			Dutch Republic	For Dutch Republic Navy.
Unknown date	Starrenberg	Sixth rate	van Leeuwen	Rotterdam	Dutch Republic	For Dutch Republic Navy.
Unknown date	Valkenier	Fourth rate			Dutch Republic	For Dutch Republic Navy.
Unknown date	Walcheren	Third rate	Adriaan Janszoon de Vriend	Vlissingen	Dutch Republic	For Dutch Republic Navy.
