= List of ship launches in 1693 =

The list of ship launches in 1693 includes a chronological list of some ships launched in 1693.

Date	Ship	Class	Builder	Location	Country	Notes
27 January	Queen	First rate	Anthony Deane, Portsmouth Dockyard	Portsmouth	England	For Royal Navy.
January	Pélican	Third rate	Félix Arnaud	Bayonne	Kingdom of France	For French Navy.
11 February	Carlisle	Fourth rate	Snelgrove	Deptford	England	For Royal Navy.
21 February	Terrible	First rate	Blaise Pangalo	Brest	Kingdom of France	For French Navy.
23 February	Éole	Second rate	Pierre Chaillé	Le Havre	Kingdom of France	For French Navy.
February	Fort	Second rate	Pierre Masson	Rochefort	Kingdom of France	For French Navy.
23 March	Rosa	Third rate	Iseppo di Piero de Pieri	Venice	Republic of Venice	For Venetian Navy.
28 March	Norfolk	Third rate	John Winter	Southampton	England	For Royal Navy.
28 March	Portland	Fourth rate	Lawrence, Woolwich Dockyard	Woolwich	England	For Royal Navy.
30 March	Humber	Third rate	Frame	Hull	England	For Royal Navy.
11 April	Sussex	Third rate	Lee, Chatham Dockyard	Chatham	England	For Royal Navy.
11 April	Winchester	Fourth rate	Wyatt	Bursledon	England	For Royal Navy.
15 April	Stella Maris	Third rate	Stefano Conti	Venice	Republic of Venice	For Venetian Navy.
10 June	Southampton	Fourth rate	Parker & Winter	Southampton	England	For Royal Navy.
25 June	Falmouth	Fourth rate	Snelgrove	Limehouse	England	For Royal Navy.
24 July	Dartmouth	Fourth rate	Shish	Rotherhithe	England	For Royal Navy.
8 August	Weymouth	Fourth rate	Stigant, Portsmouth Dockyard	Portsmouth	England	For Royal Navy.
17 August	Bon	Fourth rate	Jean-Pierre Brun	Brest	Kingdom of France	For French Navy.
24 August	Norwich	Fourth rate	Castle	Deptford	England	For Royal Navy.
20 September	Medway	Fourth rate	Daniel Furze, Sheerness Dockyard	Sheerness	England	For Royal Navy.
September	Tonnant	Tonnant-class ship of the line	François Coulomb	Toulon	Kingdom of France	For French Navy.
1 October	Triomphant	First rate		Lorient	Kingdom of France	For French Navy.
13 October	Gaillard	Third rate	Felix Arnaud	Bayonne	Kingdom of France	For French Navy.
October	Saint Philippe	Tonnant-class ship of the line	François Coulomb	Toulon	Kingdom of France	For French Navy.
14 November	Foudroyant	First rate	Blaise Pangalo	Brest	Kingdom of France	For French Navy.
16 December	Torbay	Third rate	Harding, Deptford Dockyard	Deptford	England	For Royal Navy.
18 December	Canterbury	Fourth rate	Snelgrove	Deptford	England	For Royal Navy.
Unknown date	Alkmaar	Third rate		Hoorn	Dutch Republic	For Dutch Republic Navy.
Unknown date	Amalia	Fourth rate			Dutch Republic	For Dutch Republic Navy.
Unknown date	Armenian Merchant	Merchant ship		River Thames	England	For British East India Company.
Unknown date	Damiaten	Fourth rate	Hendrik Cardinaal, Amsterdam Naval Yard	Amsterdam	Dutch Republic	For Dutch Republic Navy.
Unknown date	Delfshaven	Sixth rate fluyt	van Leeuwen, Rotterdam Naval Yard	Rotterdam	Dutch Republic	For Dutch Republic Navy.
Unknown date	Forrester	Transport ship	Portsmouth Dockyard	Portsmouth	England	For Royal Navy.
Unknown date	Graaf van Solms	Fourth rate			Dutch Republic	For Dutch Republic Navy.
Unknown date	Jersey	Sixth rate	Fisher Harding	Deptford	England	For Royal Navy.
Unknown date	Mignon	Fourth rate	Felix Arnaud	Bayonne	Kingdom of France	For French Navy.
Unknown date	Le Saint Esprit	Privateer frigate		Bayonne	Kingdom of France	For Jean Magon de la Lande.
Unknown date	Lizard	Sixth rate	Robert Lee	Chatham Dockyard	England	For Royal Navy.
Unknown date	Loo	Third rate	Hendrik Cardinaal, Amsterdam Naval Yard	Amsterdam	Dutch Republic	For Dutch Republic Navy.
Unknown date	Mercury	Advice boat	William Stigant	Portsmouth Dockyard	England	For Royal Navy.
Unknown date	Muiderberg	Fourth rate	Amsterdam Naval Yard	Amsterdam	Dutch Republic	For Dutch Republic Navy.
Unknown date	Nellebladet	Fourth rate			Denmark	For Dano-Norwegian Navy.
Unknown date	Oud Naarden	Sixth rate		Dunkerque	Kingdom of France	For Dutch Republic Navy.
Unknown date	Phoenix	Fifth rate fireship	Gardner Dalton	Rotherhithe	England	For Royal Navy.
Unknown date	Prins Frisco	Third rate			Dutch Republic	For Dutch Republic Navy.
Unknown date	Reigersbergen	Third rate	Hendrik Cardinaal, Amsterdam Naval Yard	Amsterdam	Dutch Republic	For Dutch Republic Navy.
Unknown date	Rochester	Fourth rate	Lee, Chatham Dockyard	Chatham	England	For Royal Navy.
Unknown date	Schieland	Fourth rate	van Leeuwen	Rotterdam	Dutch Republic	For Dutch Republic Navy.
Unknown date	Schotenbosch	Fifth rate frigate	Hendrik Cardinaal, Amsterdam Naval Yard	Amsterdam	Dutch Republic	For Dutch Republic Navy.
Unknown date	Sorlings	Fifth rate frigate	Nicholas Barrett	Shoreham-by-Sea	England	For Royal Navy.
Unknown date	Utrecht	Third rate			Dutch Republic	For Dutch Republic Navy.
February	Wren	Pink	William Stigant	Redbridge	England	For Royal Navy.
Unknown date	name	Third rate		Enkhuizen	Dutch Republic	For Dutch Republic Navy.
Unknown date	Zeelandia	Second rate	van Leeuwen, Rotterdam Naval Yard	Rotterdam	Dutch Republic	For Dutch Republic Navy.
