= French ship Admirable =

Five French ships of the line carried the name Admirable.

- French ship Frédéric (1666), a 64-gun ship built in 1666 (in Copenhagen) under the name Frédéric and renamed Admirable on 24 June 1671; hulked in 1676 and broken up in 1677
- French ship Souverain (1678), an 80-gun ship given the name Admirable in 1677 while building but renamed Souverain on 28 June 1678 (exchanging names with the ship listed next)
- French ship Henri (1668), a 74-gun ship built in 1668 as the Henri and renamed Souverain on 24 June 1671, was subsequently named Admirable on 28 June 1678; broken up in 1689
- French ship Admirable (1691), a ship of 84 guns launched in 1691 but burnt by the Anglo-Dutch forces at Cherbourg in June 1692
- French ship Admirable (1692), a ship of 96 guns launched in December 1692 to replace the previous ship of that name; she was broken up in 1716
