= Foudroyant =

Foudroyant has been the name of several ships, both British and French:

- HMS Foudroyant—for British ships of this name.
- French ship Foudroyant—for French ships of this name.
