= HMS Chatham (1691) =

Ship of the line of the Royal Navy

History

Great Britain
- Name: HMS Chatham
- Ordered: 14 March 1690
- Builder: Robert Lee, Chatham Dockyard
- Launched: 20 October 1691
- Fate: Sunk as breakwater, 1749

General characteristics as built
- Class & type: 50-gun fourth rate ship of the line
- Tons burthen: 686^{54}/94 (bm)
- Length: 126 ft (38.4 m) (on the gundeck) 109 ft 6 in (33.4 m) (keel)
- Beam: 34 ft 4 in (10.5 m)
- Depth of hold: 13 ft 4 in (4.1 m)
- Propulsion: Sails
- Sail plan: Full-rigged ship
- Armament: Lower deck: 22 × 12-pounders; Upper deck: 18 × 8-pounders; QD: 8 × 4-pounder guns; Fc: 2 × 4-pounder guns

General characteristics after 1721 rebuild
- Class & type: 1719 Establishment 50-gun fourth rate ship of the line
- Tons burthen: 756 exact (bm)
- Length: 134 ft (40.8 m) (on the gundeck) 109 ft 8 in (33.4 m) (keel)
- Beam: 36 ft (11.0 m)
- Depth of hold: 15 ft 2 in (4.6 m)
- Propulsion: Sails
- Sail plan: Full-rigged ship
- Armament: Gundeck: 22 × 18-pounder guns; Upper gundeck: 22 × 9-pounder guns; QD: 4 × 6-pounder guns; Fc: 2 × 6-pounder guns

HMS Chatham was a 50-gun fourth rate ship of the line of the Royal Navy, the first of five such ships to be ordered in 1690 (the others were the Centurion and Chester on 20 March - six days after the Chatham - and the Norwich and Weymouth on 15 August). The Chatham was built by Master Shipwright Robert Lee at the eponymous dockyard, and launched on 20 October 1691. She was designed to the same lines as Lee's previous 50-gun ship, the Sedgemoor of 1687 - her specification was for a length of 123 ft, breadth of 34ft 3in and depth in hold of 13ft 9in, although she measured very slightly more on completion.

Her original armament comprised 22 culverins (16-pounders) on the lower deck, 18 x 8-pounders on the upper deck, and 10 minions (4-pounders). She was later re-armed in accordance with the 1703 Establishment of guns, with 22 x 12-pounders on the lower deck, 22 x 6pounders on the upper deck, 8 more 6-pounders on the quarterdeck and 2 more on the forecastle. After re-building, she was armed in accordance with the 1716 Establishment of guns, with 22 x 18-pounders, 22 x 9-pounders and 6 x 6-pounders.

Under the command of Captain Robert Bokenham, on 14 January 1705 she took the 30-gun St Malo privateer Connetable, and on 8 August 1705 she (along with the Medway) captured the French 60-gun Auguste, built in Brest in 1704, which the British took into service as HMS Auguste.

Captain Robert Harland, circa 1680–1751. In 1714 he commanded the Chatham (seen here in the background) in the Baltic under Sir John Norris, but retired soon after

She underwent a rebuild according to the 1719 Establishment at Deptford from 1718 to 1721.

== Fate ==
Chatham served until September 1749, when she was sunk as a breakwater at Sheerness. She was raised and taken to pieces there in May 1762.
