= French ship Saint Philippe (1693) =

Ship of the line of the French Navy

History

Kingdom of France
- Name: Saint Philippe
- Ordered: Late 1692
- Builder: François Coulomb, Toulon Dockyard
- Laid down: December 1692
- Launched: October 1693
- Completed: December 1693
- Fate: Taken to pieces in 1714

General characteristics
- Tonnage: 1,750
- Length: 158 French feet (Note: The French foot (pre-metric) was 6.575% longer than the equivalent English foot.)
- Beam: 44½ French feet (14.45m)
- Draught: 23 French feet (7.47m)
- Depth of hold: 20½ French feet
- Decks: 3 gun decks
- Complement: 870 (750 in peacetime), + 10/13 officers
- Armament: 90 guns

Saint Philippe was a First Rank ship of the line of the French Royal Navy, the second vessel in the two-ship Tonnant Class (her sister being the Tonnant).

This ship was ordered in late 1692 to be built at Toulon Dockyard, and on 20 January 1693 she was allotted the name Saint Philippe, taking the name of a ship lost in the action at La Hogue in June 1692. The designer and builder of both ships was François Coulomb, and they represented an enlargement of his design of 1691 for the Sceptre, with an extra pair of guns (and gunports) added on each level. They were three-decker ships without forecastles. The Saint Philippe was launched in October 1693 and completed in December of the same year.

At the French Ancre Publishing Compagny published till December 2018 a Monography with a full set of plans for this ship - scaled in 1/48 for Model building.

She was initially armed with 90 guns, comprising twenty-eight 36-pounders on the lower deck, thirty 18-pounders on the middle deck, twenty-six 12-pounders on the upper deck, and six 6-pounders on the quarterdeck.

The Saint Philippe was rebuilt at Toulon from February 1699 to 1700; she took part in the Battle of Vélez-Málaga on 24 August 1703 as the Flagship. She ships state room was hit by a bomb-vessel and several officers died. In July 1707 - during the siege of Toulon - she and her sister were undergoing a refit in the basin of Le Mourillon, and avoided the scuttling order which affected most other French ships at Toulon; they were sailed to counter the British attack, and subsequently were used as floating batteries. The Saint Philippe was condemned at Toulon on 18 August 1714, and was subsequently taken to pieces.
