= Battle of Cherbourg (disambiguation) =

The land Battle of Cherbourg was fought in the vicinity of the town in 1944.

The Battle of Cherbourg may also refer to:

- Raid on Cherbourg, a British attack on Cherbourg in 1758
- Action at Cherbourg (1628), a naval battle in the Anglo-French War (1627-1629)
- Action at Cherbourg (1692), a follow-up to the Battle of Barfleur
- Battle of Cherbourg (1864), a naval battle in the American Civil War
