= French ship Tonnant (1693) =

Ship of the line of the French Navy

History

Kingdom of France
- Name: Tonnant
- Ordered: Late 1692
- Builder: François Coulomb, Toulon Dockyard
- Laid down: December 1692
- Launched: September 1693
- Completed: December 1693
- Fate: Sold to be taken to pieces by order of 28 May 1710

General characteristics
- Tonnage: 1,750
- Length: 158 French feet (Note: The French foot (pre-metric) was 6.575% longer than the equivalent English foot.)
- Beam: 44½ French feet
- Draught: 23 French feet
- Depth of hold: 20½ French feet
- Decks: 3 gun decks
- Complement: 850 (725 in peacetime), + 10/13 officers
- Armament: 90 guns

Tonnant was a First Rank ship of the line of the French Royal Navy, the lead vessel in the two-ship Tonnant class (her sister being Saint Philippe).

This ship was ordered in late 1692 to be built at Toulon Dockyard, and on 20 January 1693 she was allotted the name Tonnant, taking the name of a ship lost in the action at La Hogue in June 1692. The designer and builder of both ships was François Coulomb, and they represented an enlargement of his design of 1691 for Sceptre, with an extra pair of guns (and gunports) added on each level. They were three-decker ships without forecastles. Tonnant was launched in September 1693 and completed in December of the same year.

She was initially armed with 90 guns, comprising twenty-eight 36-pounders on the lower deck, thirty 18-pounders on the middle deck, twenty-six 12-pounders on the upper deck, and six 6-pounders on the quarterdeck. A fifteenth pair of 12-pounders was added on the upper deck about 1706, raising her to 92 guns.

Tonnant was rebuilt at Toulon from November 1701 to January 1702; she took part in the Battle of Vélez-Málaga on 24 August 1703. In July 1707 - during the siege of Toulon - she and her sister were undergoing a refit in the basin of Le Mourillon, and avoided the scuttling order which affected most other French ships at Toulon; they were sailed to counter the British attack, and subsequently were used as floating batteries. Tonnant was condemned at Toulon on 7 April 1710, and on the following 28 May she was ordered to be sold and taken to pieces.
