= French ship Foudroyant =

Eleven ships of the French Navy have borne the name Foudroyant ( literally "Like lightning", or "embodying the speed and violence of lightning"):

- Foudroyant (1669), a 70-gun ship of the line
- Foudroyant (1691), an 82-gun ship of the line
- Foudroyant, renamed Soleil-Royal in 1693
- Foudroyant (1693), a 104-gun ship of the line
- Foudroyant (1724), a 110-gun ship of the line
- Foudroyant (1751), an 80-gun ship of the line which in 1758 was captured by the British Navy, becoming HMS Foudroyant
- Foudroyant (1799), an 80-gun ship of the line
- Foudroyant (1800) a prame (a vessel propelled by oars and sails) of 12 guns of 24 pounds
- Foudroyant, a central battery and barbette battleship of the Redoutable type
- Foudroyant (1929), a L'Adroit-class destroyer
- Foudroyant (1941) a Le Hardi-class destroyer launched in 1938 as Fleuret and renamed in 1941; she was scuttled in 1942
- Le Foudroyant (S610), a ballistic missile submarine of the Redoutable type

Also, HMS Implacable, originally French ship Duguay-Trouin, was renamed Foudroyant before being scuttled.

== See also ==
- French ship Foudroyante
- HMS Foudroyant (1758)
