= French ship Soleil-Royal =

Three French ships of the line of the Ancien Régime have borne the name Soleil Royal ("Royal Sun"), honouring the personal emblem of Louis XIV:

- French ship Soleil Royal (1669), present at the Battle of Barfleur
- French ship Soleil-Royal (1692)
- French ship Soleil-Royal (1749)

Furthermore, French ship Foudroyant (1693) was briefly named Soleil Royal before taking her final name.

== Sources ==
- Les « Soleil Royal » de la marine de l’Ancien Régime, Nicolas Mioque
