= French ship Soleil-Royal (1692) =

Ship of the line of the French Navy

History

Kingdom of France
- Namesake: "Regal Sun" (a synonym for the Sun King, Louis XIV)
- Laid down: June 1692
- Launched: 24 December 1692
- Completed: April 1693
- Commissioned: March 1693 as Soleil-Royal
- Fate: Taken to pieces, 1714

General characteristics
- Tonnage: 2,400
- Length: 170 French feet (Note: The French foot (pre-metric) was 6.575% longer than the equivalent English foot.)
- Beam: 46 French feet (14.94 m)
- Draught: 24½ French feet
- Depth of hold: 22 French feet
- Complement: 900 (950 from 1694), + 17 officers
- Armament: 104 guns

Soleil-Royal (Regal Sun) was a First Rank ship of the line of the French Royal Navy.

This ship was originally planned to be a 2nd Rank two-decker to be built at Brest, but – following the loss of fifteen major French warships by Anglo-Dutch attacks at Cherbourg and La Hougue during the first few days of June 1692 – she was ordered in the same week to be built instead as a First Rank three-decker of 104 guns. On 21 June she was given the name Foudroyant to replace the previous ship bearing that name (destroyed at La Hogue). She was designed by Étienne Hubac and laid down the same month at Brest Dockyard and launched on 24 December 1692.

Two more three-deckers were ordered and begun at Brest during June (as Merveilleux) and August 1692 (as Terrible, and a further three-decker was ordered there on 20 January 1693, which Louis XIV ordered should bear the name Soleil Royal to replace the previous ship bearing that name (destroyed at Cherbourg). All three ships were to be designed and built by Blaise Pangalo. However, Étienne Hubac begged the King that that name should be given to the ship he was building instead, because the previous Soleil Royal had been built by his own father, Laurent Hubac, and – as he himself had rebuilt that ship from the keel up at Brest in 1689 – he still possessed the moulds for that ship. Moreover, he pointed out to the King that his own ship would be some 4 feet longer and some 200 tons larger than Pangalo's new ship, so would be more deserving of the name that honoured Louis XIV himself. On 1 March 1693, the King agreed to Hubac's proposal and the names of the two ships were exchanged. Hubac's ship was thus completed under the name Soleil Royal in April 1693 and brought into service.

The new ship took part in the Battle of Lagos on 28 June 1693, and subsequently in the Battle of Vélez-Málaga on 24 August 1704, where she was the flagship of Lieut-Général Joseph Andrault, Marquis de Langeron. She was scuttled in Toulon on Louis's orders in July 1707 to avoid being set alight by the bombardment by the English fleet. She was later put back afloat, but in October 1713 she was judged unfit for service, and was taken to pieces during 1714.
