= French ship Triomphant (1693) =

Ship of the line of the French Navy

History

France
- Name: Triomphant
- Builder: Lorient Dockyard
- Laid down: February 1693
- Launched: 1 October 1693
- Out of service: June 1717
- Fate: Broken up by February 1726

General characteristics
- Length: 161 French feet 4 inches (Note: The French (pre-metric) foot was 6.575% longer than the equivalent English foot.)
- Beam: 45 French feet 8 inches
- Draught: 23½ French feet
- Depth of hold: 21 French feet 8 inches
- Armament: 94 (later 90) guns

Triomphant was a First Rank three-decker ship of the line of the French Royal Navy. She was armed with 94 guns, comprising twenty-eight 36-pounder guns on the lower deck, thirty 18-pounder guns on the middle deck, and twenty-eight 8-pounder guns on the upper deck, with eight 6-pounder guns on the quarterdeck. In 1699 the 8-pounders on the upper deck were replaced by twenty-six 12-pounders, and one pair of 6-pounders was removed from the quarterdeck.

Designed and constructed by Laurent Coulomb, she was begun at Port Louis, Lorient in February 1693 and launched on 1 October 1693. She was a replacement for the previous ship of the same name (originally named Constant), destroyed by an English fireship at Cherbourg in June 1692. She took part in the Battle of Vélez-Málaga on 13 August 1704. In July 1707 she was sunk in shallow water at Toulon to avoid the fire from bomb vessels, but was refloated in October. She was condemned and hulked at Toulon in June 1717, and was broken up in February 1726.
