= Peter Puget =

British naval officer and explorer

Rear-Admiral Peter Puget
- Born: 1765; London, England
- Died: 31 October 1822 (aged 56–57); Bath, Somerset, England
- Spouse: Hannah Elrington Puget
- Military career
- Branch: Royal Navy
- Service years: 1778–1822
- Rank: Rear-Admiral
- Commands: Chatham, Adelphi, Esther, HMS Raven, San Nicholas, HMS Van Tromp, HMS Temeraire, HMS Monarch, HMS Foudroyant, HMS Goliath

Peter Puget (1765 – 31 October 1822) was an officer in the Royal Navy, best known for his exploration of Puget Sound, which is named for him.

== Midshipman Puget ==
Puget's ancestors had fled France for Britain during Louis XIV's persecution of the Huguenots. His father, John, was a successful merchant and banker, but died in 1767, leaving Puget's mother, Esther, with two sons and three daughters. In 1778, twelve-year-old Peter entered the navy as a midshipman and served on the following ships:

- 1778: HMS Dunkirk, an ageing 60 gun two-decker, Captain John Milligan. Harbour service.
- December 1779: HMS Syren, frigate, Captain Edmund Dodd. Patrolled North Sea, battling blockade runners.
- 1780: HMS Lowestoffe, 32, Captain Edmund Dodd, (transferred from Syren); bound for the West Indies squadron. There, Puget served with a small force of naval gunners reinforcing the garrison at St. Kitts, and survived the defence of Brimstone Hill against the vastly superior forces of French Admiral de Grasse (see Battle of St. Kitts). Probably served in Rodney and Hood's victory of 12 April 1782 at the Battle of the Saintes.
- November 1782: HMS Thetis, 38, Captain John Blankett; Gibraltar and Mediterranean
- 1783: HMS Europa, 50, Captain James Vashon, flying the broad pennant of Commodore Alan Gardner; service in Jamaica. Met then-Lieutenant George Vancouver. Paid off in 1787.
- 1787: Rejoined Captain Dodd on the Lowestoffe, but within two months, that was paid off too.
- 1788 (?): East Indiaman Prince

== Lieutenant Puget and the Discovery ==
Upon returning to Britain, Puget was assigned to HMS Discovery, temporarily as a master's mate, and then commissioned as her 3rd lieutenant on 11 June 1790 to assist in its fitting out for an exploration of the South Pacific. During the Nootka Crisis, however, it was used as a depot vessel. When the crisis ended with the Treaty of Nootka Sound, the mission changed; the first priority was to physically accept possession of the Sound from the Spanish. An accurate survey the North American Pacific Coast, and other surveys, were important secondary missions. Because the Admiralty, following the Mutiny on the Bounty incident, had ordered, as a precaution against mutiny, that ships no longer make such long voyages alone, the armed tender HMS Chatham was assigned to the expedition, and HMS Daedalus was to bring supplies a year later.

In 1791, Discovery and Chatham sailed to Cape Town, Australia, Tahiti and the Sandwich Isles before starting a detailed survey of the Pacific North American coast, from the Columbia River to Alaska. Many features were named after friends or persons of influence. When it was hoped that the Georgia Strait and Admiralty Inlet might lead to the Northwest Passage, Vancouver anchored the ships near modern-day Seattle, Washington and sent Puget in command of two rowing craft to survey south (20–27 May 1792). In recognition of Puget's work, Vancouver named the south end Puget Sound (what we now call the South Puget Sound); it is unlikely that either man realized this name would encompass the whole region over time. Puget was also involved in the exploration by small boat of the Columbia River under the command of Chatham's captain, William Robert Broughton; Puget's name was applied to the tiny Puget Island opposite the Indian village at Cathlamet.

Puget was given command of Chatham when her first captain, Broughton, was sent with dispatches back to England with instructions to request further clarified orders from Admiralty as regarded the Crown's position on territorial negotiations with the Spanish.

== Commander and captain ==
While only a lieutenant-in-command of Chatham, Puget served with distinction for the rest of the survey. He assisted Vancouver in negotiations with the Spanish at Nootka Sound. In 1795, the two-ship squadron returned to England by way of Cape Horn, capturing a Dutch East Indiaman along the way. Once home, Puget was confirmed in the rank of Commander.

In February 1796, Commander Puget was given the tiny Adelphi with which to protect a supply convoy to Gibraltar. To protect the return convoy, he fitted out an armed freighter, the Esther, using his own funds. On the return voyage, he captured a Spanish merchantman and sent it ahead with a prize crew. Then his convoy was attacked by French frigate La Bellona, and Puget interposed his tiny vessel to let the other ships flee. Puget then bribed the French captain (pointing out that he was unlikely to collect much in prize money) and brought his command home. The British Admiralty found a way not to pay Puget prize money on the merchantman, although it did cover his expenses, including the bribe.

In 1797, Puget was given command of the sloop-of-war HMS Raven and joined the fleet of Sir John Jervis. Jervis put him in charge of the San Nicholas, a Spanish ship-of-the-line, still crewed by Spaniards; Puget suppressed a mutiny and delivered the crew to Lisbon.

- 1798: Captain of troopship HMS Van Tromp
- March, 1799: Flag captain for Admiral James Whitshed on HMS Temeraire, 98.
- 1800: Captain of ship-of-the-line HMS Monarch, 74; served with the Channel Fleet until she was paid off in 1802, following the Peace of Amiens
- 1804: Flag captain for Rear Admiral Sir Thomas Graves on HMS Foudroyant, 80; served in Channel blockade until seriously injured in 1805; sent home to recover.
- February 1807: Captain of ship-of-the-line HMS Goliath, 74.

In 1807, Puget played a decisive role at the Second Battle of Copenhagen. He led an inshore squadron of shallow-draft vessels (including two bomb ketches) to disable the Danish gunboats and to cover the army's seaward flank in a manoeuvre similar to Nelson's action in the First Battle of Copenhagen. However, British public reaction to the second attack was unfavourable, since it was an attack on a neutral country; no fame was attached to Puget's success.

== Shore career ==
- 1809: At the request of Admiral Sir Richard Strachan, Puget planned and assisted in the successful amphibious invasion of the Dutch islands of Walcheren and Vlissingen.
- 1810–1817: Commissioner of the Navy at Madras. He supervised naval affairs throughout much of India, fought the corruption endemic to supply practices, and developed the new naval base at Trincomalee.

Thereafter, Puget settled into family life, living in Bath for reasons of health. He was gazetted a Companion of the Bath in 1818 and, according to the rules of seniority, he was commissioned Rear-Admiral of the Blue on 19 July 1821.

The Bath Chronicle memorialized him:

"Died on Thursday 31 October at his home in Grosvenor Place, after a long and painful illness, Rear Admiral Peter Puget C.B. This lamented officer had sailed round the world with the late Captain Vancouver, had commanded various men-of-war and was many years Commissioner at Madras, the climate of which place greatly contributed to the destruction of his health."

== Personal life ==
Peter Puget married Hannah Elrington on 6 February 1797. They had seven sons and four daughters.

Their eldest son, Peter Richard Puget, went to America and became an actor. Other sons served in the British Army or Navy, one of whom (William David) retired as a captain. The daughters all married and it is through one of them, Eleanor Catherine, came the only known descendant of Peter and Hannah Puget.

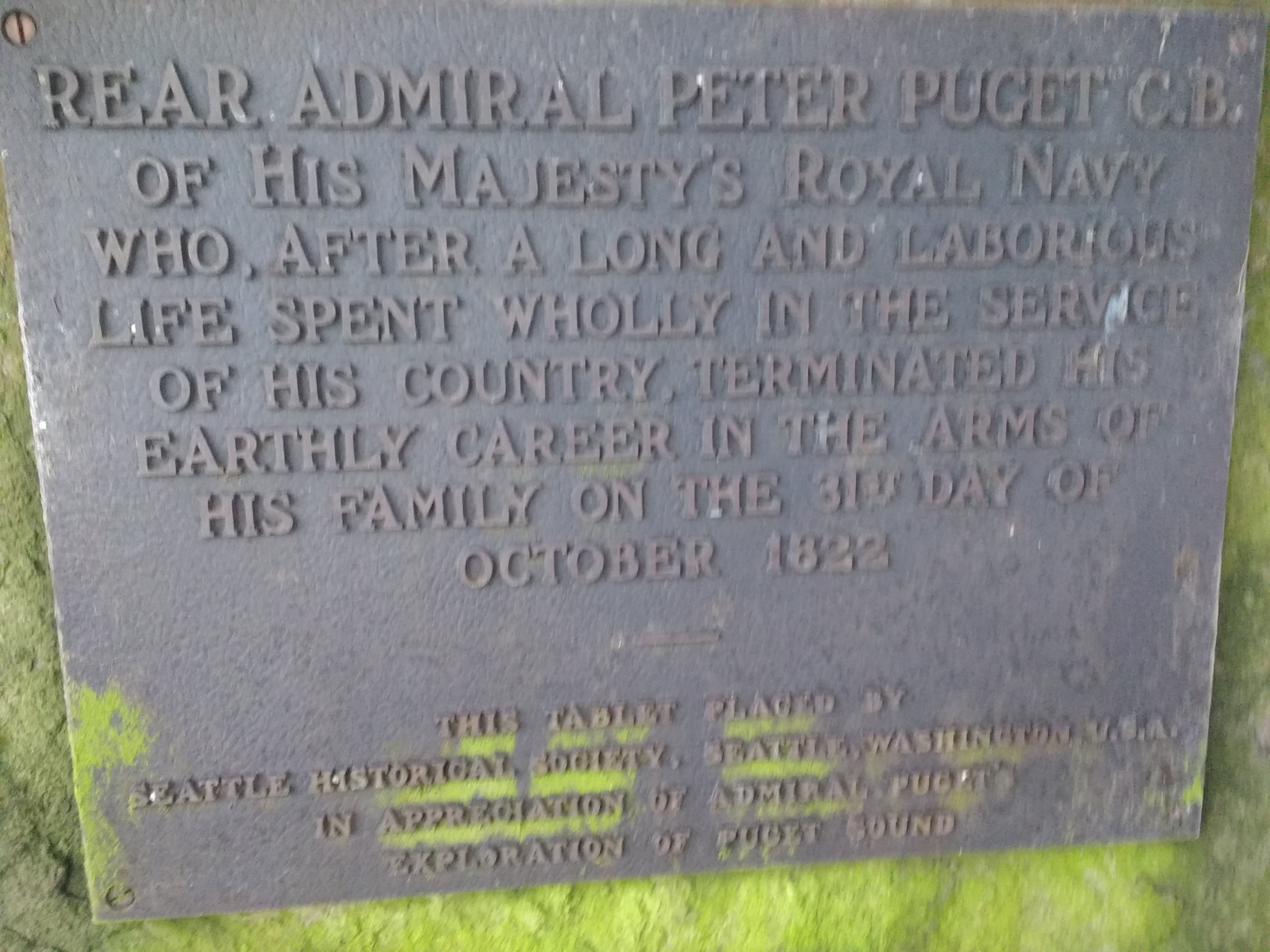
Detail of bronze plaque donated by the Seattle Historical Society.

Hannah Puget never remarried, died on 14 September 1849, and is buried next to Peter, in the churchyard of Woolley, near Bath. The original sarcophagus was covered by overgrowth and lost its original inscription; a bronze plaque donated by the Seattle Historical Society was dedicated in 1965.
