= French ship Soleil-Royal (1749) =

Ship of the line of the French Navy

- Soleil-Royal (fifth from right) during the Battle of Quiberon Bay

History

Kingdom of France
- Name: Soleil-Royal
- Namesake: "Royal Sun"
- Builder: Brest
- Laid down: March 1748
- Launched: 30 June 1749
- Commissioned: April 1750
- Homeport: Brest
- Fate: Scuttled on 21 November 1759

General characteristics
- Displacement: 3800 tonneaux
- Tons burthen: 2200 port tonneaux
- Length: 59.2 m (194 ft 3 in)
- Beam: 15.6 m (51 ft 2 in)
- Draught: 7.6 m (24 ft 11 in)
- Propulsion: Sails
- Complement: 1,000 men, 14 officers
- Armament: 80 guns: 30 × 36-pounder long guns; 32 × 24-pounder long guns; 22 × 8-pounder long guns

Soleil-Royal was a ship in the French Navy, the third ship of that name. She was the first 80-gun two-decker to use the 24-pounder long gun on her second battery, giving her considerable firepower for the time and allowing her to challenge three-deckers. Her name Soleil-Royal, honouring the French crown and usually reserved for the largest units of the Navy, testifies to the change of focus from large three-deckers to strong two-deckers.

She was Brienne's flagship at the battle of Quiberon Bay, where she ran aground and was burnt to prevent her capture. Her cannons were recovered by the Royal Navy and transported to Plymouth for reuse in British vessels.
