= HMS Centurion (1691) =

Ship of the line of the Royal Navy

History

Great Britain
- Name: HMS Centurion
- Ordered: 20 March 1690
- Builder: Fisher Harding, Deptford Dockyard
- Launched: 6 March 1691
- Fate: Broken up, 1728

General characteristics
- Class & type: 50-gun fourth rate ship of the line
- Tons burthen: 614 ^{35}/94 bm
- Length: 125 ft 8.5 in (38.3 m) (gundeck) 105 ft (32.0 m) (keel
- Beam: 33 ft 2 in (10.1 m)
- Depth of hold: 13 ft 5 in (4.1 m)
- Propulsion: Sails
- Sail plan: Full-rigged ship
- Armament: 50 guns of various weights of shot

HMS Centurion was a 50-gun fourth rate ship of the line of the Royal Navy, launched in 1691. She was ordered on 20 March 1690 to be built at Deptford Dockyard by Master Shipwright Fisher Harding - on the same day as her stable-mate Chester (to be built at Woolwich Dockyard), and six days after the first ship of this batch (the Chatham to be built at Chatham Dockyard) - to a similar design to the prototype of this "123-ft" type - the Sedgemoor of 1687. The specified dimensions in the ordxer were for a length of 125 ft by 32ft 6in by 13ft 4in, but on completion she measured about 8 inches longer and in breadth. She was launched on 6 March 1691 (15 days before the Chester and 45 days before the Chatham).

The Centurion took part in the Battle of Barfleur in May 1692 under the command of Captain Francis Wyvell, and at the Battle of Velez-Malaga on 13 August 1704 under Captain John Herne. She served until 1728, and was broken up at Plymouth in February 1729.
