= French ship Soleil Royal (1669) =

Ship of the line of the French Navy

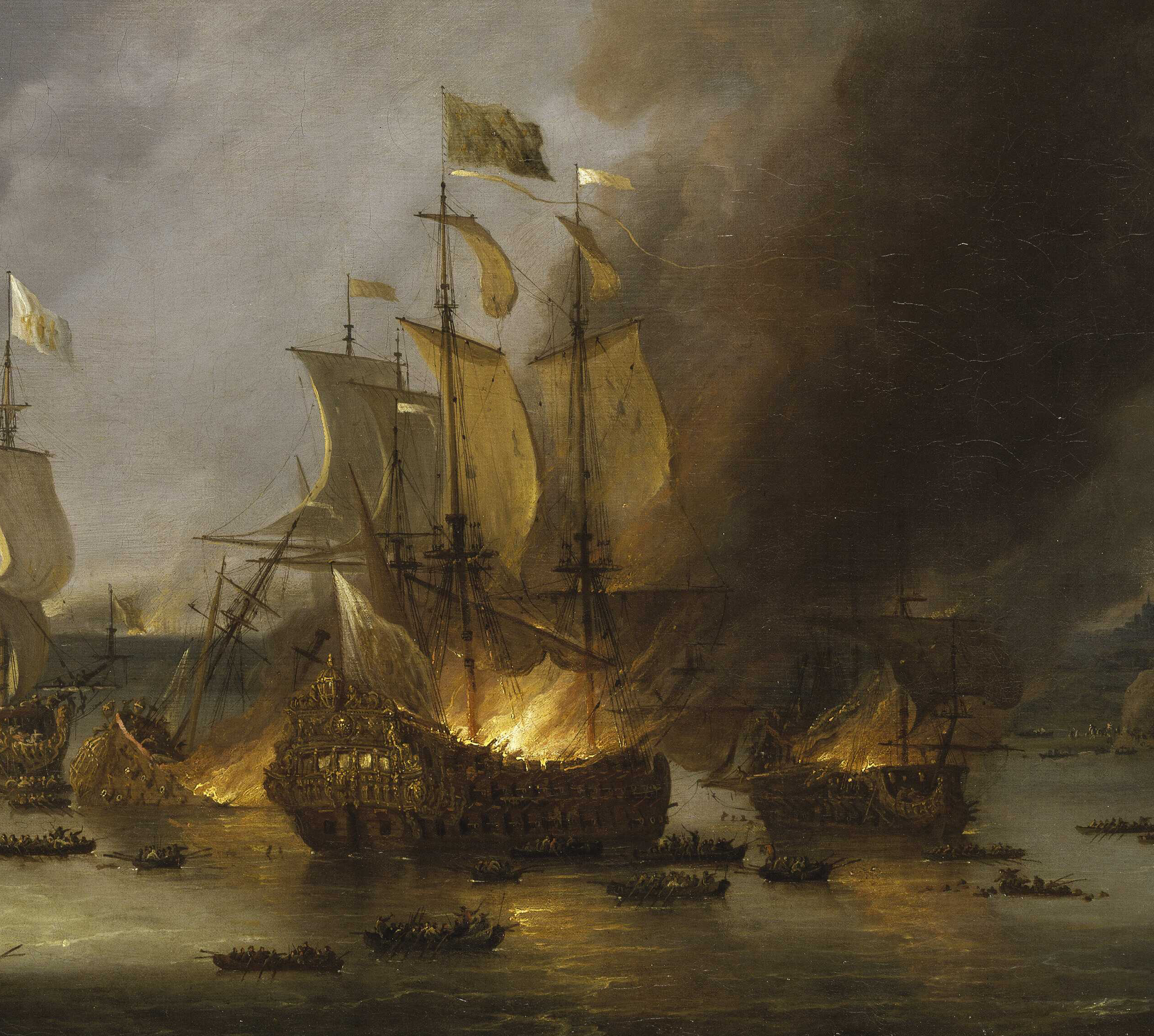
- Soleil Royal on fire at the action at La Hogue

History

Kingdom of France
- Laid down: December 1668
- Launched: 13 December 1669
- Completed: August 1670
- Commissioned: 1671 (?)
- Out of service: The night of June 2nd and 3rd 1692
- Fate: Destroyed by fireships

General characteristics
- Displacement: 2,500 tonneaux
- Tons burthen: 2,400 port tonneaux
- Length: 61 m (200 ft)
- Beam: 15.64 m (51.3 ft)
- Draught: 7.64 m (25.1 ft)
- Propulsion: sails
- Complement: 836
- Armament: 104 guns: 36-pounder long guns; 18-pounder long guns; 12-pounder long guns; 8-pounder long guns; 4-pounder long guns

Soleil Royal (Royal Sun) was a 104-gun ship of the line of the French Navy. She was the flagship of Admiral Anne Hilarion de Tourville.

She was built in Brest, France between 1668 and 1670 by shipwright Laurent Hubac, was launched in 1669, and stayed unused in the Brest harbour for years. She was recommissioned with 112 guns and 1200 men when the Nine Years' War broke out in 1688 as the flagship of the Ponant Fleet.

She was said to be a good sailing ship and her decorations were amongst the most beautiful and elaborate of all baroque flagships. The emblem of the "sun" had been chosen by Louis XIV as his personal symbol.

== Career ==
=== Battle of Beachy Head ===
Soleil Royal was recommissioned with 112 guns and 1200 men when the Nine Years' War broke out. She departed Brest on 22 June 1690 as flagship of Anne Hilarion de Tourville. She spent three days in Camaret-sur-Mer waiting for favourable wind before sailing to Isle of Wight where the English fleet was thought to be anchored. Two ships sent in reconnaissance located the English anchored at Beachy Head.

The Battle of Beachy Head (known in French as "Bataille de Béveziers") began in the morning of 10 July 1690 when the French surprised the English ships anchored. Soleil Royal led the centre of the French formation.

=== Battle of Barfleur ===
In 1692, on 12 May, now carrying 104 guns, she left Brest, leading a 45-vessel fleet; on the 29th, the squadron met a 97-ship strong English and Dutch fleet in the Battle of Barfleur. In spite of their numerical inferiority, the French attacked but were forced to flee after a large-scale battle resulting in heavy damage to both sides. The Soleil Royal was too severely damaged to return to Brest, and was beached in Cherbourg for repairs, along with the Admirable and Triomphant.

=== Battle at Cherbourg and the end of the Soleil Royal ===
During the night of 2 and 3 June, beached at the Pointe du Hommet, she was attacked by 17 ships, which she managed to repel with artillery fire. However, a fireship set her stern on fire and the fire soon reached the powder rooms. Although the population of Cherbourg came to rescue, there was only one survivor among the 883 (or even 950)-strong crew.

The remains of the Soleil Royal now lie buried beneath a parking space next to the Arsenal.

== Legacy ==
Soleil Royal became a traditional name for capital ships of the Ancien Régime, and several ships bore it afterwards.

A detailed 1/40th scale model of the hull and sculptures was built in 1839 by sculptor and modelist Jean-Baptiste Tanneron. This model is now on display at the Musée national de la Marine in Paris.

Soleil Royal in paintings
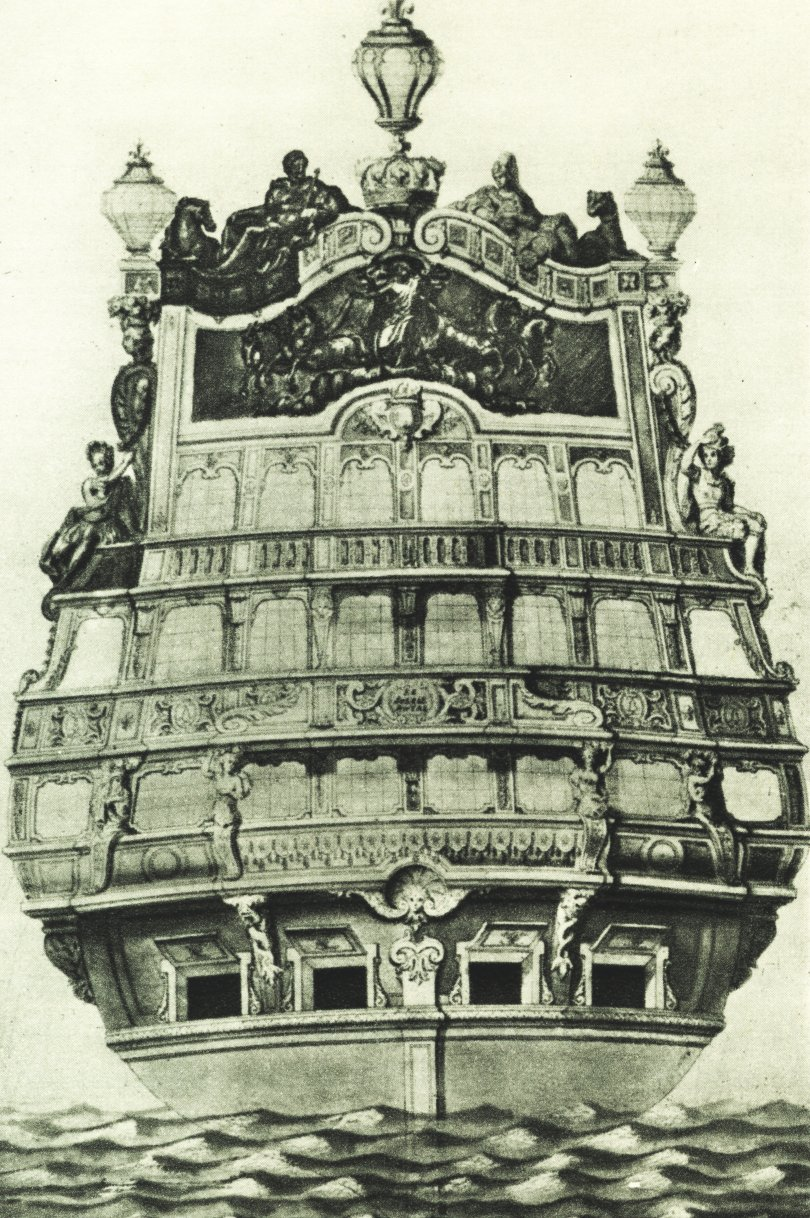
Stern of the Soleil Royal, design by Jean Bérain

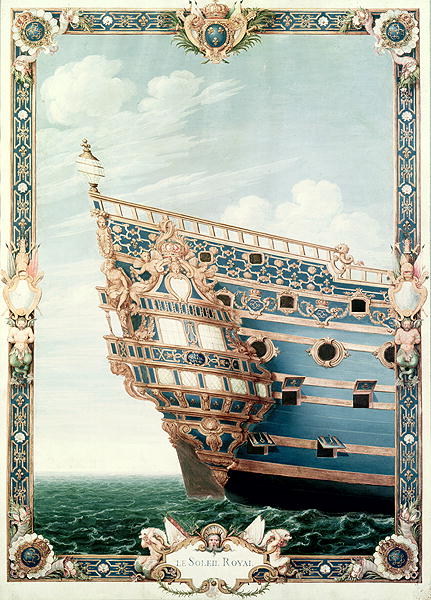
Stern of the Soleil Royal, design by Jean Bérain

The action at La Hogue on 23 May 1692

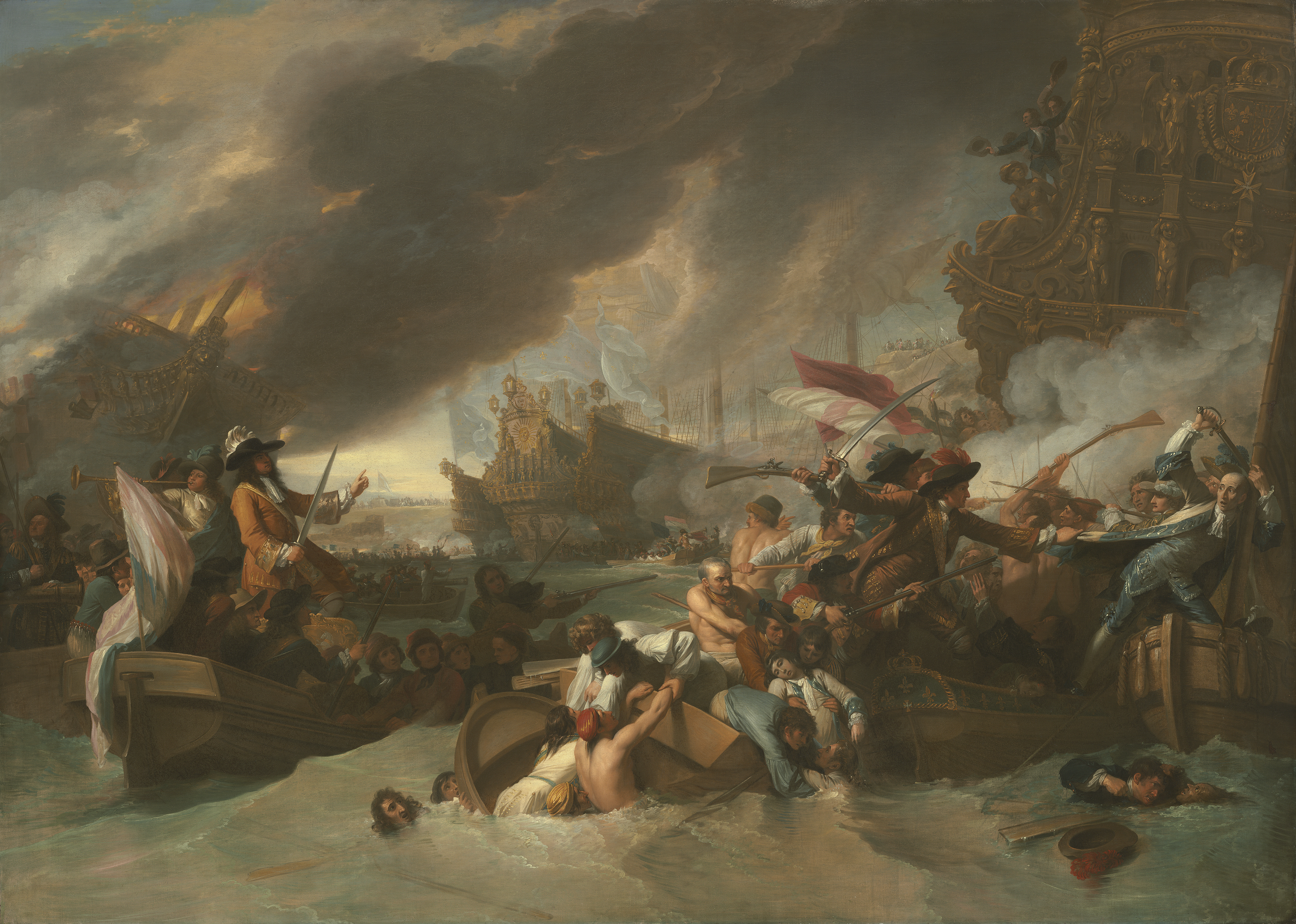
The Battle of La Hogue by Benjamin West, 1778
Model by Jean-Baptiste Tanneron
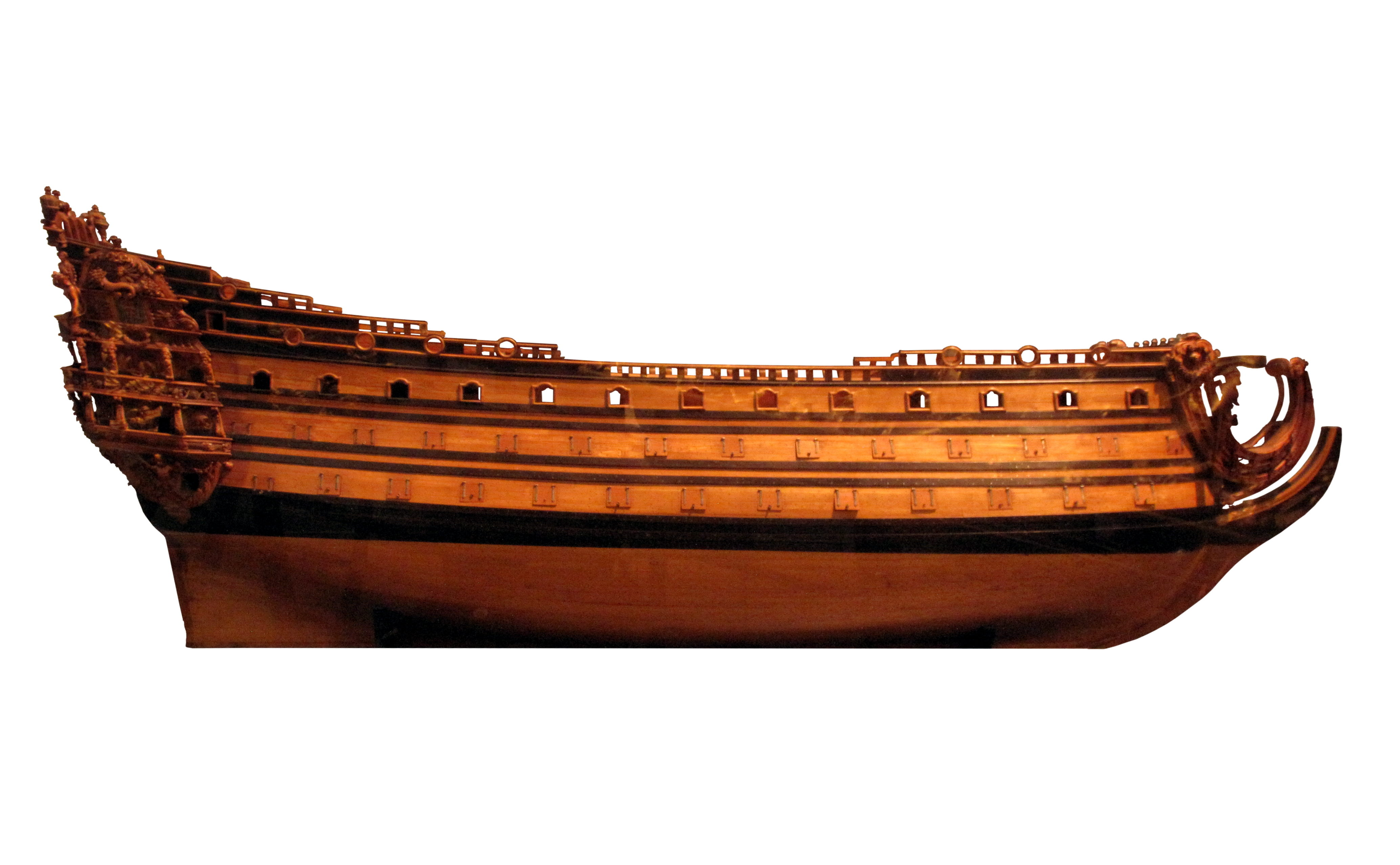
Hull

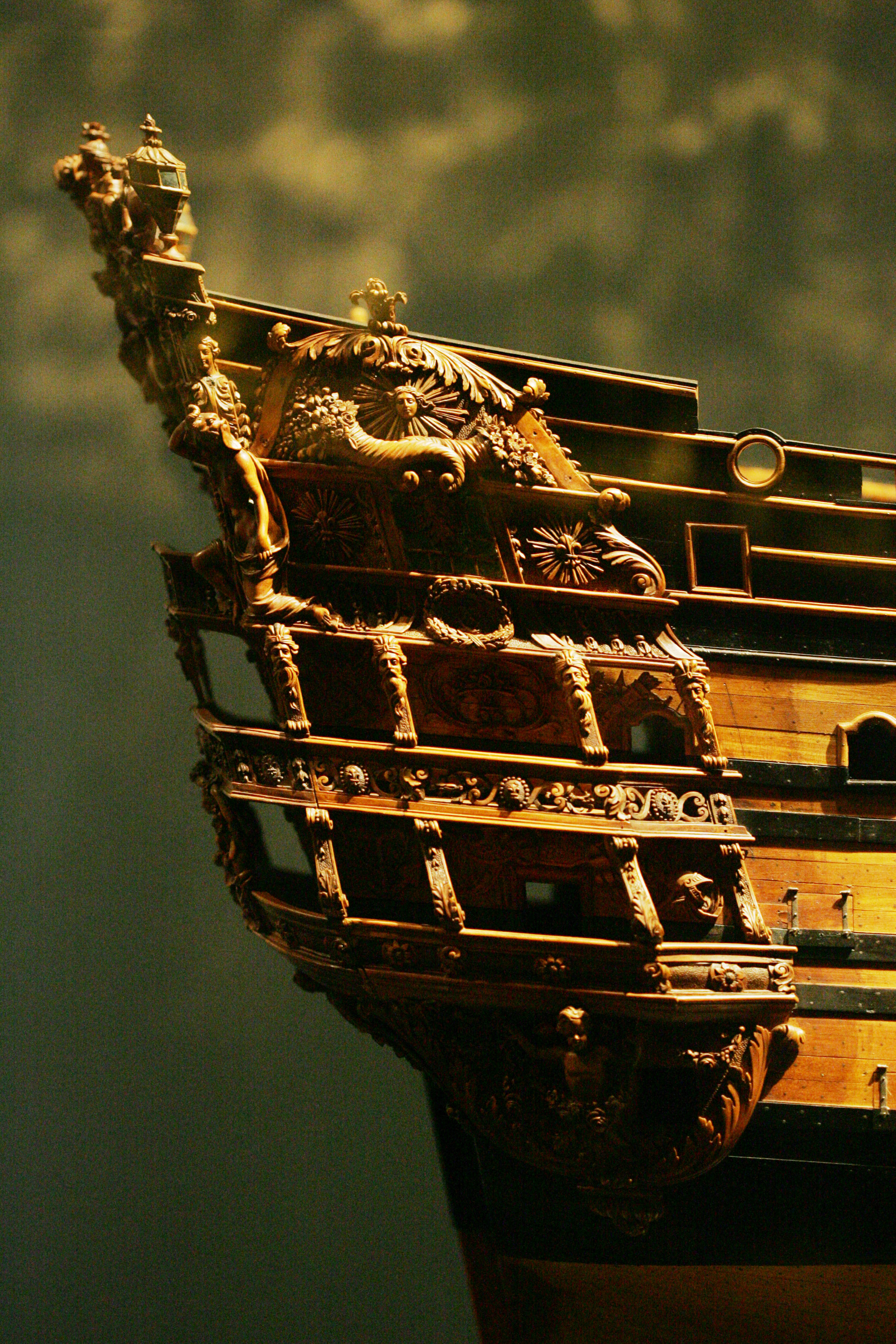
Stern

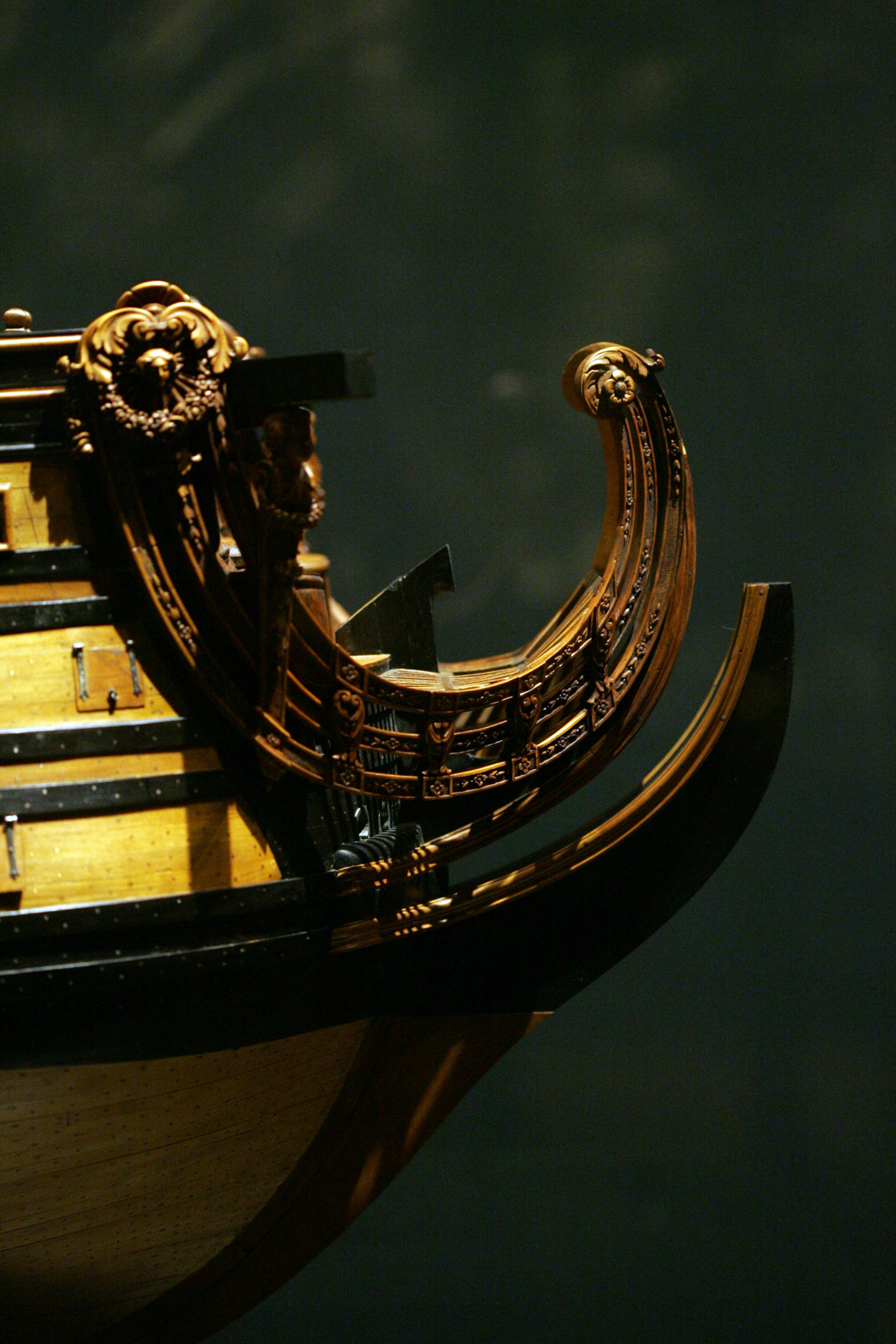
Bow

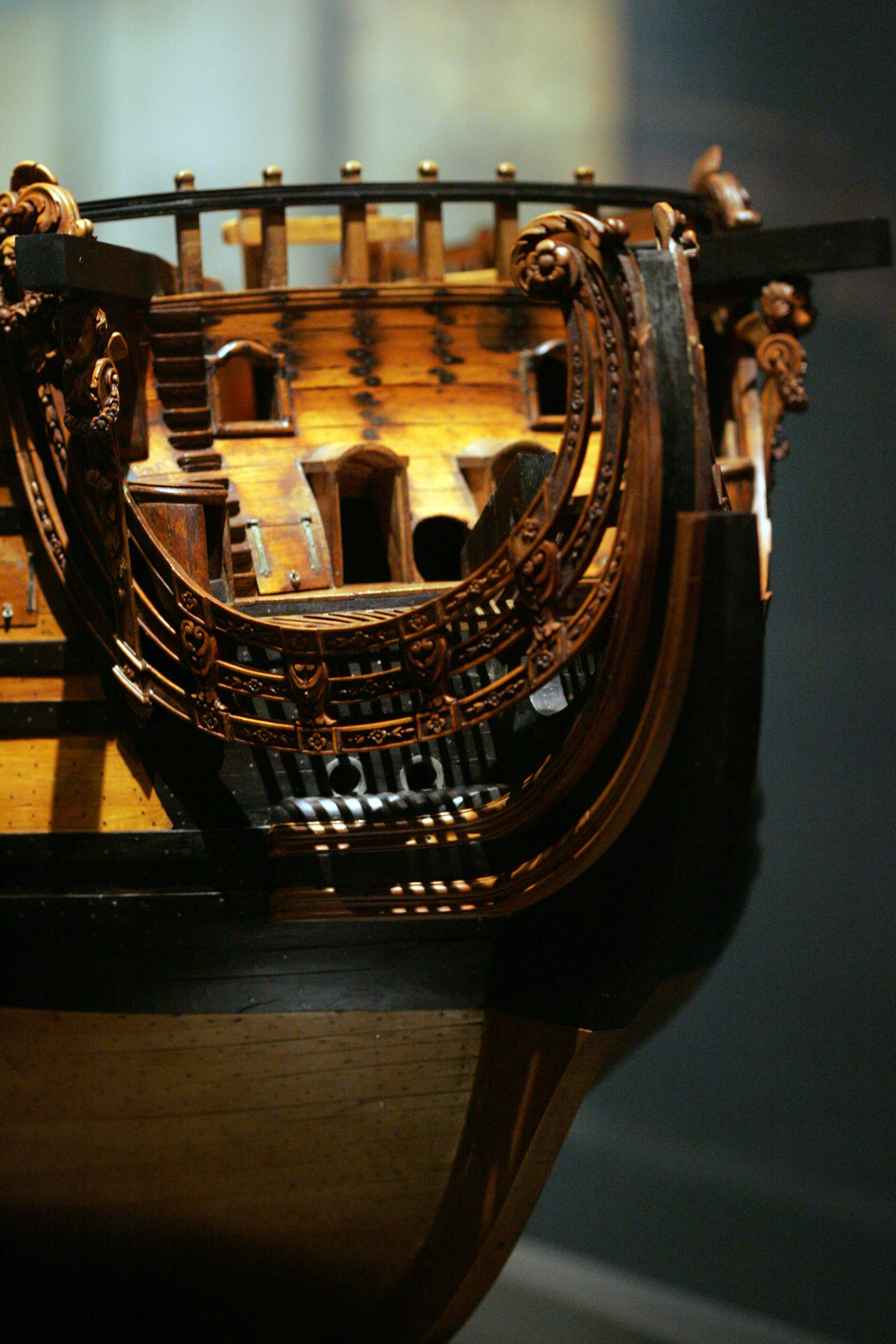
Bow

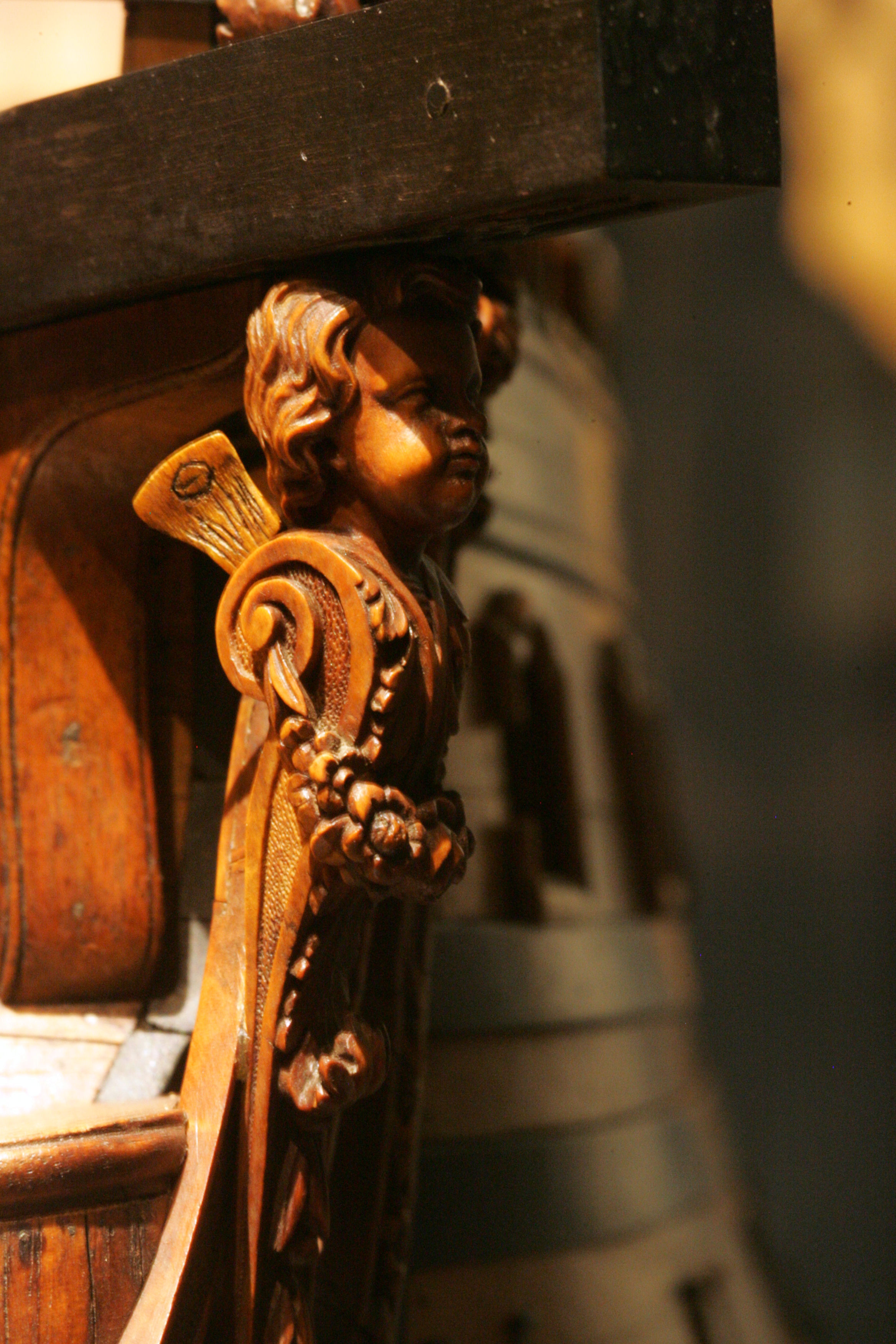
Detail of the decoration: Cathead

== See also ==
- List of world's largest wooden ships
