= French ship Foudroyante =

Five French ships of the French Navy have borne the name Foudroyante:

- A bomb vessel (1682)
- A bomb vessel (1695)
- A bomb vessel (1728) of the Ardente class
- A 16-gun vessel (1795)
- A floating battery (1855) of the Dévastation class

See also:

- French ship Foudroyant
