= French ship Triomphant (1675) =

Ship of the line of the French Navy

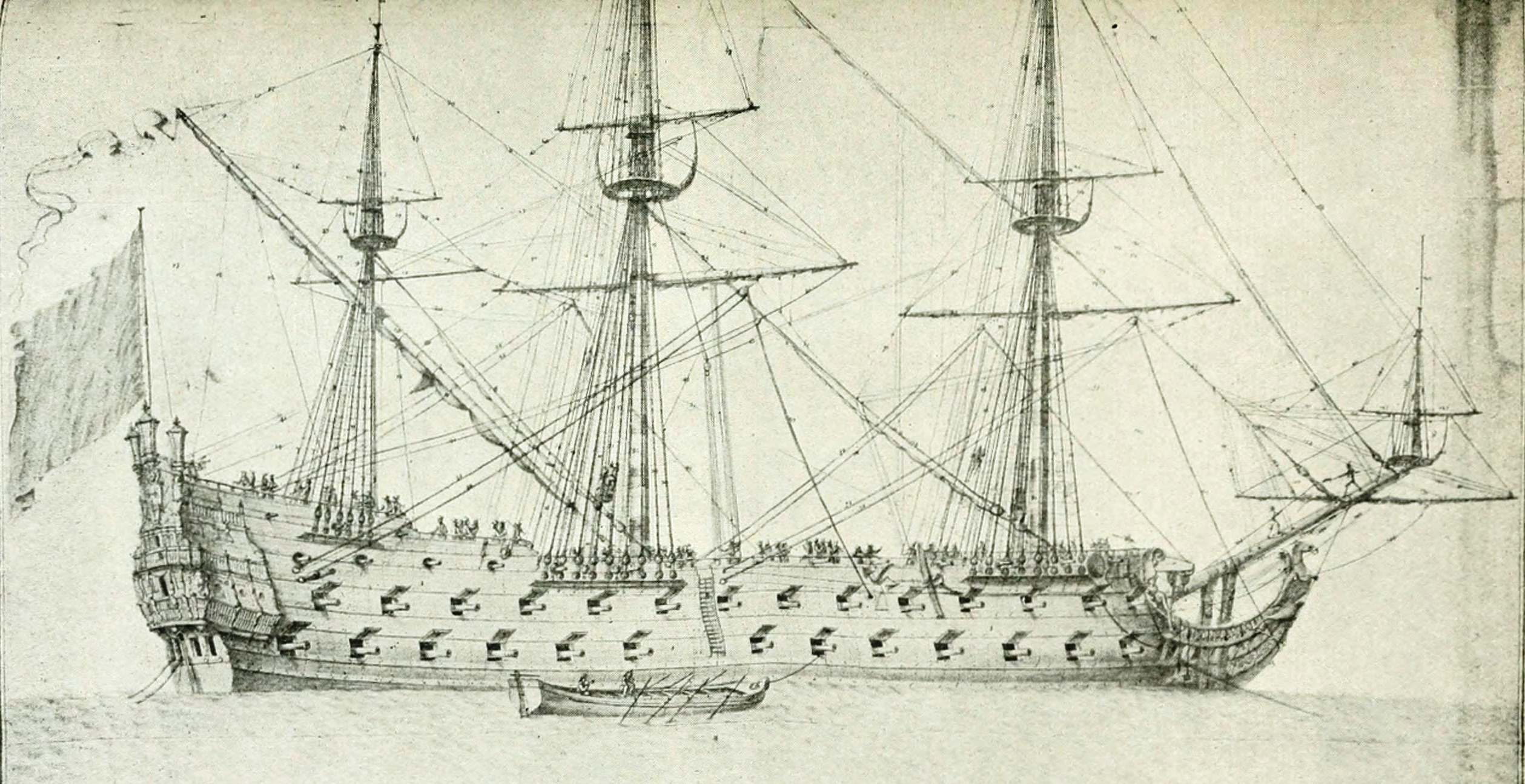
- Triomphant 1670-1680

History

France
- Name: Triomphant
- Builder: Brest Dockyard
- Laid down: May 1674
- Launched: 20 June 1675
- Completed: 1676
- Renamed: originally Brave, renamed Constant in 1675 and Triomphant in 1678
- Fate: Destroyed by fire on 2 June 1692

General characteristics
- Length: 143½ French feet (Note: The French (pre-metric) foot was 6.575% longer than the equivalent English foot.)
- Beam: 38 French feet
- Draught: 19 French feet
- Depth of hold: 18 French feet
- Complement: 400, + 9 officers
- Armament: 74 guns

The Triomphant was a ship of the line of the French Royal Navy. One of two sisterships designed and built by Laurent Hubac (the other was the Belliqueux). Started as Brave in Brest and launched on 20 June 1675, she was renamed Constant six days later, and completed in 1676; she was renamed Triomphant on 28 June 1678. She took part in the Battle of Beachy Head on July 10, 1690, and in the Battle of Barfleur on May 29, 1692.

Following the latter battle, she retreated in a battered condition to Cherbourg, along with two larger warships - the Soleil Royal and Admirable. There the three ships were attacked by English warships on 1 June 1692. This attack was beaten off, but on the following day the English employed fireships and the Admirable was set alight and burnt by the English fireship HMS Woolf.
