= HMS Chester (1691) =

Ship of the line of the Royal Navy

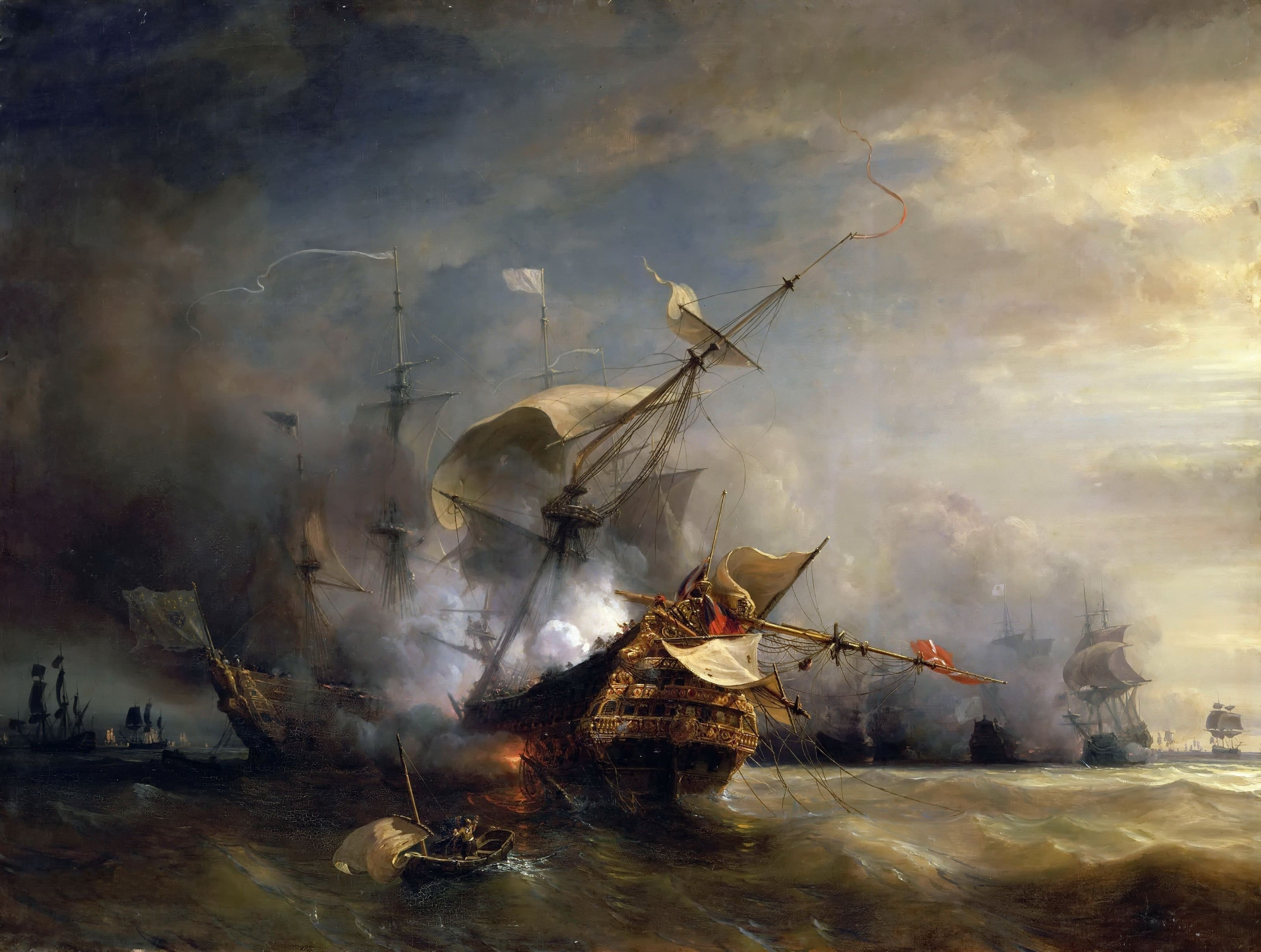
- Possible depiction of Chester at the Battle at The Lizard

History

Great Britain
- Name: HMS Chester
- Ordered: 20 March 1690
- Builder: Joseph Lawrence, Woolwich Dockyard
- Launched: 21 March 1691
- Captured: 1707

General characteristics
- Class & type: 50-gun fourth-rate ship of the line
- Tons burthen: 663 ^{55}/94 bm
- Length: 125 ft 1 in (38.1 m) (gundeck) 105 ft 10 in (32.3 m) (keel
- Beam: 34 ft 4 in (10.5 m)
- Depth of hold: 13 ft 10.25 in (4.2 m)
- Propulsion: Sails
- Sail plan: Full-rigged ship
- Armament: 50 guns of various weights of shot

HMS Chester was a 50-gun fourth-rate ship of the line of the Royal Navy, launched 21 March 1691. She was ordered on 20 March 1690 to be built at Woolwich Dockyard by Master Shipwright Joseph Lawrence - on the same day as her stable-mate Centurion (to be built at Deptford Dockyard), and six days after the first ship of this batch (the Chatham to be built at Chatham Dockyard) - to a similar design to the prototype of this "123-ft" type - the Sedgemoor of 1687. She was launched on 21 March 1691 (15 days after the Centurion and 30 days before the Chatham).

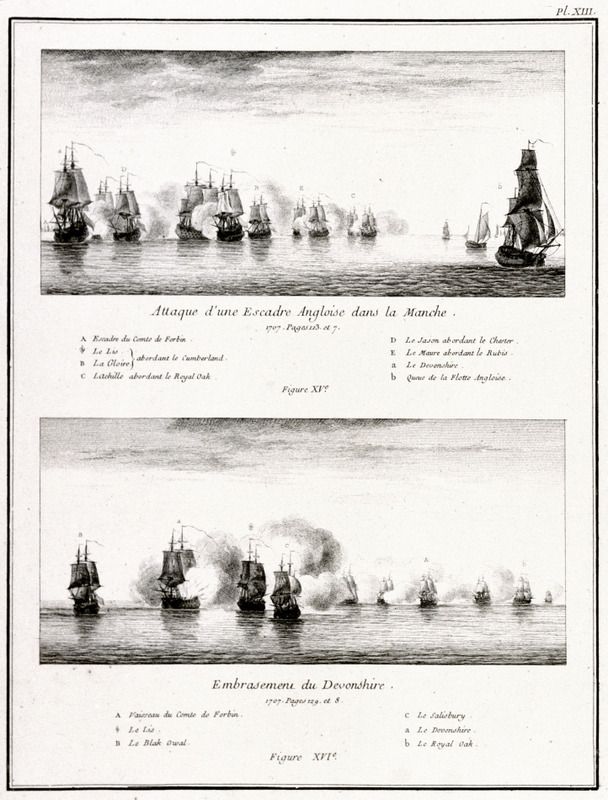
A print published in France shows the Chester during the Action of 2 May 1707 off Beachy Head

She was captured by the French 56-gun privateer Jason at the Battle at The Lizard on 21 October 1707.

== See also ==
- List of ships captured in the 18th century
