= Adriaen van Diest =

Dutch-born painter

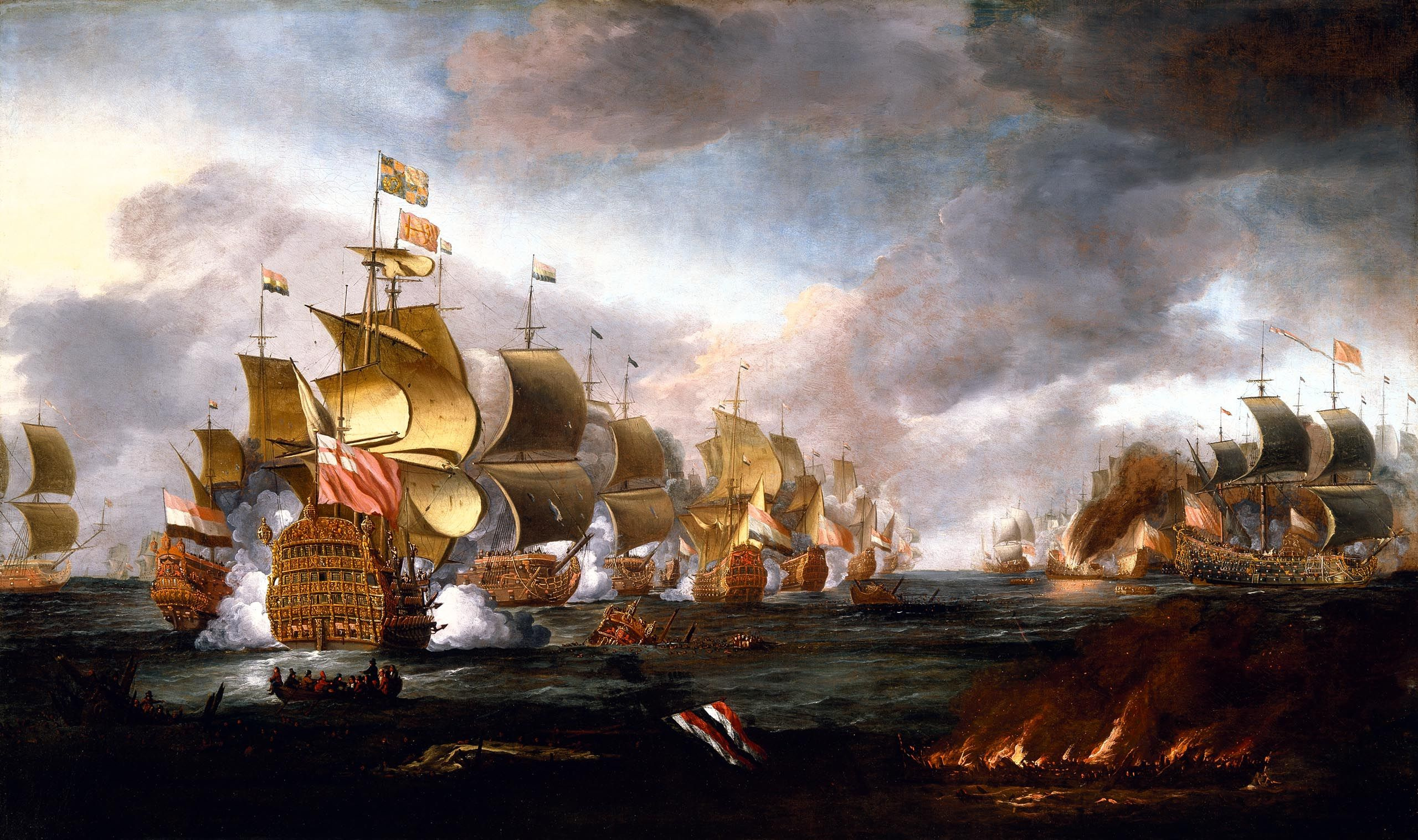
The Battle of Lowestoft (1670s)

Destruction of the Soleil Royal at the Battle of La Hogue, 23 May 1692 (c. 1700)

Adriaen van Diest (1655 – 1704) was a Dutch-born painter who specialised in marine art.

== Life ==
He was born at the Hague in 1655, the son of Jeronymus van Diest, a painter of sea-pieces, by whom he was instructed in the art. When he was seventeen years old he moved to London, where he was employed by Granville, Earl of Bath, for whom he painted several views and ruins in the west of England. He also painted portraits, but did not meet with much encouragement, although his pictures, particularly his landscapes, possess considerable merit; as a proof of which Horace Walpole states that there were seven pictures by Van Diest in Sir Peter Lely's collection. He etched several landscapes from his own designs, in a slight, masterly style. Van Diest died in London in 1704.

Unfortunately for his reputation, he is generally known by his worst pictures, which are frequently found in old houses, on wainscots, or over doors, and are executed in a hasty manner, with much mountainous background.
