= HMS Foudroyant =

List of ships with the same or similar names

Two Royal Navy ships have been named Foudroyant, the name derived from the French, meaning Thunderbolt. A third was planned but later renamed:

- HMS Foudroyant (1758) was an 80-gun third rate, captured from the French in 1758 and broken up in 1787.
- HMS Foudroyant (1798) was an 80-gun third-rate ship of the line, launched in 1798. She was used as a guardship from 1820, and a training ship from 1862. She was sold in 1892 and used as a school ship until being wrecked in 1897.
- HMS Foudroyant was to have been a battleship. She was renamed HMS Neptune shortly before her launch in 1909.

== See also ==
- HMS Trincomalee was renamed Foudroyant in 1897 whilst serving as a replacement for the wrecked schoolship. She was renamed Trincomalee in 1991 and is currently preserved as a museum ship.
- Implacable, originally the French ship Duguay-Trouin, was renamed Foudroyant in 1943 before being scuttled in 1949.
- French ship Foudroyant
