= French ship Saint Philippe (1663) =

Ship of the line of the French Navy

History

France
- Name: Saint Philippe
- Namesake: Saint Philip
- Owner: French Royal Navy
- Builder: Rodolphe Gédéon, in Toulon Dockyard
- Laid down: early 1661
- Launched: 3 February 1663
- Completed: 15 April 1664
- Out of service: November 1699
- Renamed: Victorieux on 24 June 1671
- Fate: Burnt at La Hogue on 2 June 1692

General characteristics
- Class & type: ship of the line
- Tonnage: 1,450 tons
- Length: 146 French feet (Note: The (pre-metric) French foot was 6.575% longer than the equivalent English foot.)
- Beam: 36½ French feet
- Depth of hold: 18½ French feet
- Decks: 3 gun decks
- Complement: 500 (later 600), +9 officers
- Armament: 74 guns: 8 × 36-pounder long guns + 18 × 24-pounder long guns on lower deck; 26 × 18-pounder long guns on middle deck; 18 × 8-pounder long guns on upper deck; 4 × 4-pounder long guns on poop
- Armour: Timber

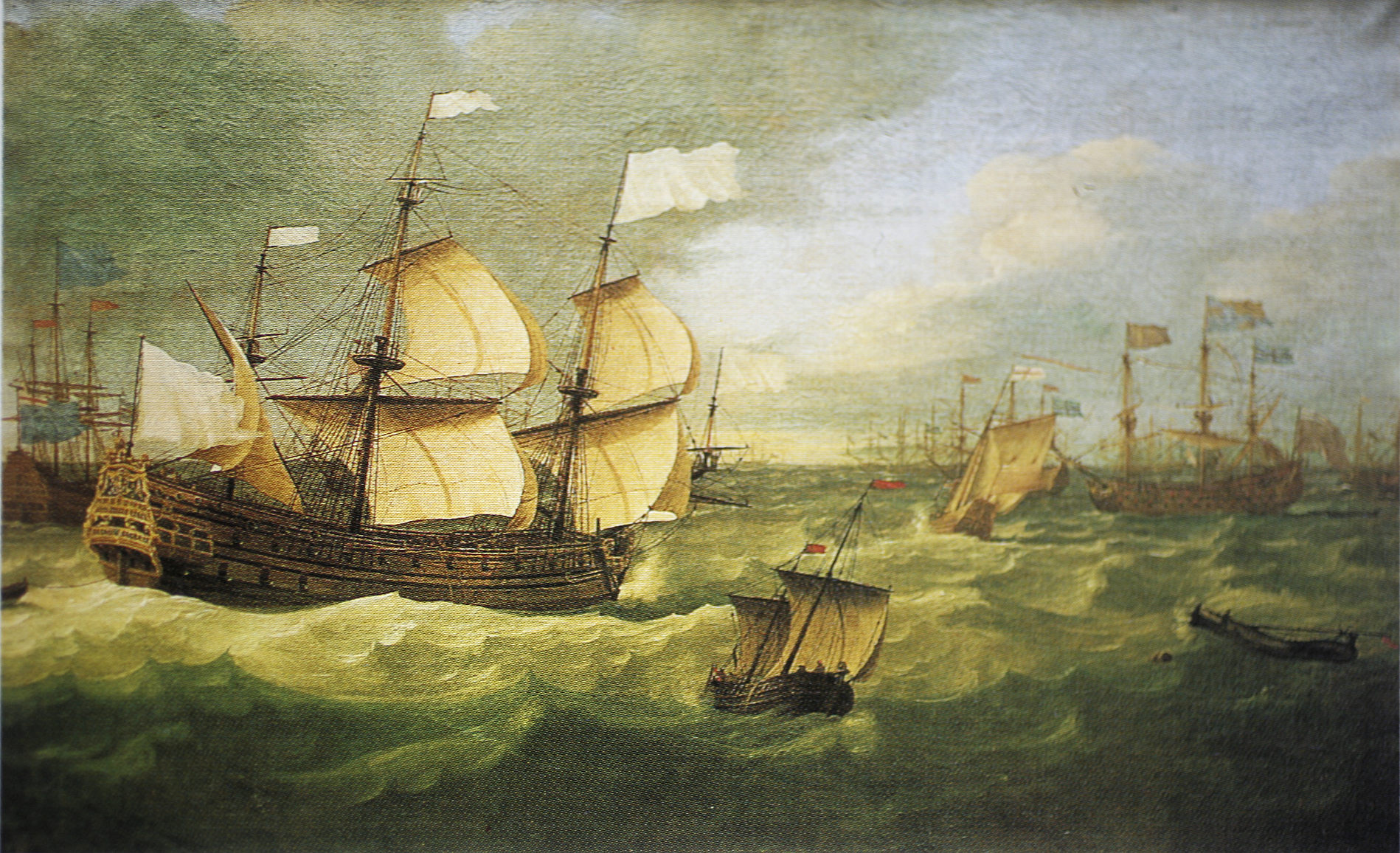
Painting of Saint Philippe in Sole Bay

Saint Philippe was a 74-gun ship of the line of the French Royal Navy. She was built at Brest Dockyard, designed and constructed by Laurent Hubac. She was nominally a three-decker, but in practice the upper deck was divided into armed sections aft and forward of the unarmed waist, making the upper deck equivalent to a quarterdeck and forecastle.

She took part in the Battle of Cherchell on 24 August 1665 (as flagship of François de Bourbon-Vendôme, Duc de Beaufort) and in the Battle of Solebay on 7 June 1672 (as flagship of Vice-admiral Jean d'Estrées). She was refitted at Brest from 2 August to 11 September 1683, emerging with 70 guns, and recommissioned in June 1689 as the flagship of chef d'escadre Jean Gabaret. She took part in the Battle of Beachy Head on 10 July 1690 (as flagship of Alain Emmanuel de Coëtlogon) and in the Battle of Barfleur on 29 May 1692. Following the latter battle, she was beached at La Hogue where she was attacked and burnt by the English on 2 June 1692
