= French ship Lys (1691) =

Ship of the line of the French Navy

History

Kingdom of France
- Name: Lys
- Ordered: 30 April 1691
- Builder: François Coulomb, Toulon Dockyard
- Laid down: 11 May 1691
- Launched: 17 December 1691
- Completed: February 1692
- Out of service: 18 December 1717
- Fate: Taken to pieces by order of 12 January 1718

General characteristics
- Tonnage: 1,800
- Length: 153 French feet (Note: The French foot (pre-metric) was 6.575% longer than the equivalent English foot.)
- Beam: 44 French feet
- Draught: 23 French feet
- Depth of hold: 20¼ French feet
- Decks: 3 gun decks
- Complement: 650 (500 in peacetime), + 12 officers
- Armament: 84 guns

Lys was a First Rank ship of the line of the French Royal Navy, the second vessel in the two-ship Sceptre class (her sister being Sceptre).

This ship was ordered in April 1691 to be built at Toulon Dockyard, and on 13 May she was allotted the name Lys. The designer and builder of both ships was François Coulomb. They were three-decker ships without forecastles. Lys was launched on 17 December 1691 and completed in February of the next year.

She was initially armed with 84 guns, comprising twenty-six 36-pounders on the lower deck, twenty-eight 18-pounders on the middle deck, twenty-four 8-pounders on the upper deck, and six 4-pounders on the quarterdeck. The 4-pounders were replaced by six 6-pounders by 1699; a thirteenth pair of 8-pounders (on the upper deck) and a fourth pair of 6-pounders (on the quarterdeck) were added in 1704, raising her to 88 guns.
