= French ship Admirable (1692) =

Ship of the line of the French Navy

History

France
- Name: Admirable
- Builder: Lorient Dockyard
- Laid down: July 1692
- Launched: 23 December 1692
- Commissioned: March 1693
- Out of service: March 1713
- Fate: Broken up between June and August 1716

General characteristics
- Tonnage: 2,000
- Length: 160 French feet (Note: The French (pre-metric) foot was 6.575% longer than the equivalent English foot.)
- Beam: 45½ French feet
- Draught: 23½ French feet
- Depth of hold: 21 French feet
- Complement: 725 men (550 in peacetime), + 11 officers
- Armament: 96 (later 90, then 88) guns

Admirable was a First Rank three-decker ship of the line of the French Royal Navy. She was initially armed with 96 guns, comprising twenty-eight 36-pounder guns on the lower deck, thirty 18-pounder guns on the middle deck, and twenty-eight 8-pounder guns on the upper deck, with ten 6-pounder guns on the quarterdeck. In 1699 the 8-pounders on the upper deck were replaced by twenty-six 12-pounders, and two pairs of 6-pounders was removed from the quarterdeck, reducing the ship to 90 guns; one pair of 12-pounders was removed in 1704.

Designed and constructed by Laurent Coulomb, she was begun at Lorient Dockyard in July 1692 and launched on 23 December of the same year. She was a replacement for the previous ship of the same name, destroyed by an English fireship at Cherbourg in June 1692. She took part in the Battle of Lagos on 28 June 1693 and in the Battle of Vélez-Málaga on 13 August 1704. In July 1707 she was sunk in shallow water at Toulon to avoid the fire from bomb vessels, but was refloated in October. She was condemned at Toulon on 11 March 1713, and was broken up in June/August 1716.
