= François Coulomb the Elder =

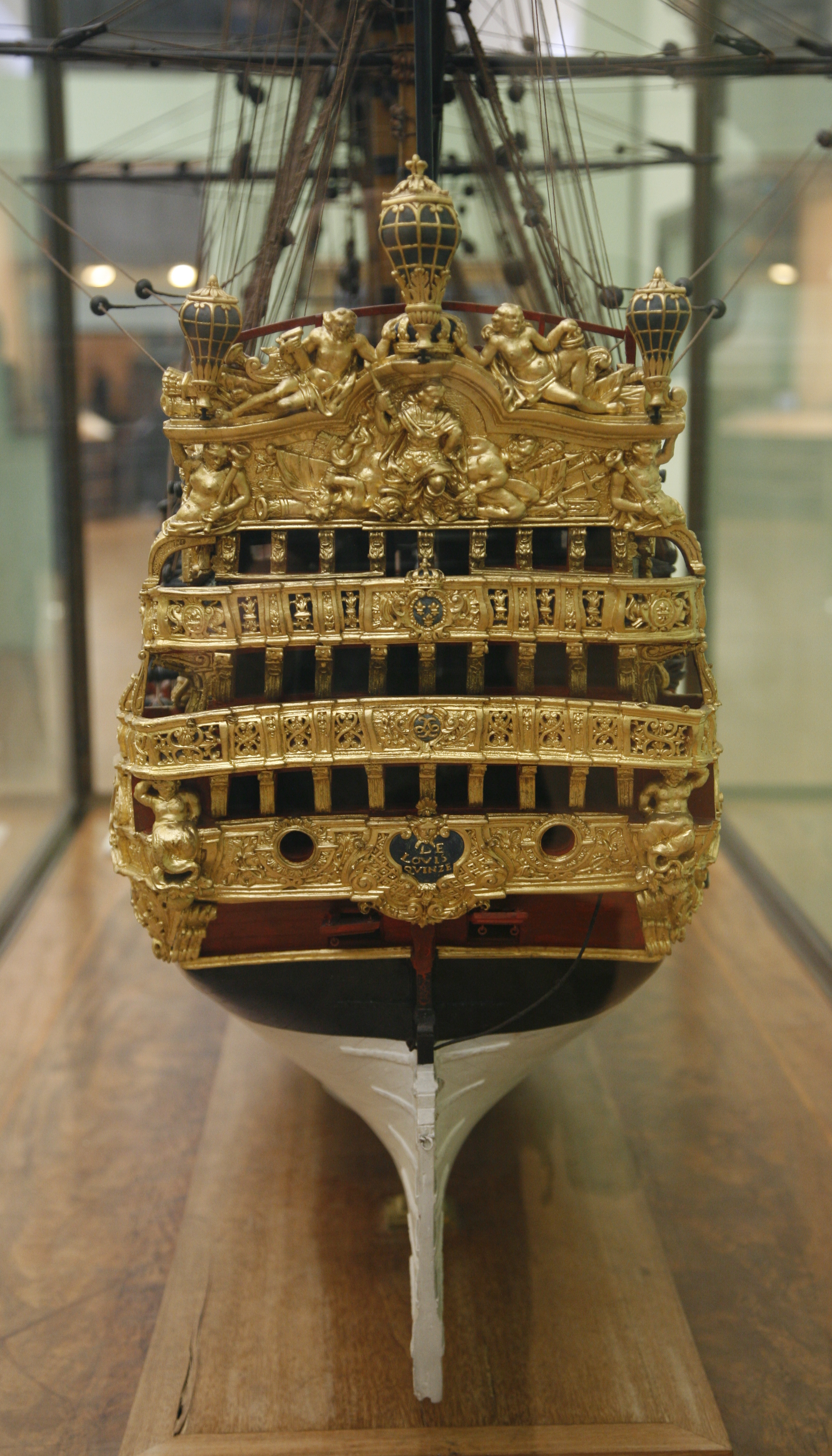
Contemporary model of a Coulomb vessel

François Coulomb the Elder was a French naval architect and builder of warships (ingénieur-constructeur), the son of Laurent Coulomb. François Coulomb was born on 24 January 1654 at La Ciotat, Provence and died on 20 March 1717 at Toulon. He is first identified in the archives under the name of "Coulomb fils" because he collaborated with his father, Laurent Coulomb, in constructing naval ships; then he became "François père" because his own son, also named François, worked in collaboration with him. In 1680, he occupied himself with the school of construction at Toulon, and wrote a manual of construction. He took the place of his father at Toulon, when the latter was named constructor at Lorient in 1690. In the course of his career he designed and built at Toulon 34 ships for the King of France, plus 2 ships for the Order of Saint John of Jerusalem (the Knights of Malta).

== Ships of the line designed and built by François Coulomb the Elder ==
- Fleuron 56 guns, launched 1689 (designed by Laurent Coulomb, but built by François Coulomb)
- Superbe 70 guns, launched 1690
- Invincible 70 guns, launched 1690
- Constant 68 guns, launched 1690
- Heureux 68 guns, launched 1690
- Sceptre 84 guns, launched 1691
- Lys 84 guns, launched 1691
- Royal Louis 110 guns, launched 1692
- Admirable 96 guns, launched 1692
- Bourbon 68 guns, launched 1692
- Phénix 60 guns, launched 1692
- Tonnant 90 guns, launched 1693
- Saint Philippe 90 guns, launched 1693
- Content 64 guns, launched 1695
- Trident 60 guns, launched 1695
- Assuré 60 guns, launched 1697
- Prudent 60 guns, launched 1697
- Oriflamme 64 guns, launched 1699
- Parfait 72 guns, launched 1701
- Toulouse 62 guns, launched 1703
- Oriflamme 62 guns, launched 1704
- Neptune 72 guns, launched 1704
- Conquérant 70 guns, launched 1712
- Toulouse 62 guns, launched 1714

In addition, two ships of 64 guns each were built between 1702 and 1704 for the Order of Saint John of Jerusalem (the Knights of Malta); these ships were the San Giovanni Battista and the San Giacomo.

== Lesser warships designed and built by François Coulomb the Elder ==
- Impudent 32 guns, fireship launched 1693 (a sistership, to have been named Fantasque, was cancelled)
- Volontaire 40 guns, launched 1693
- Volontaire 44 guns, launched 1695 (replacement for previous ship)
- Salamandre 20-gun bomb vessel, launched 1696
- Proserpine 6-gun bomb vessel, launched 1696
- Vulcain 6-gun bomb vessel, launched 1696
- Adélaide 44 guns, launched 1699
- Sylvie 40 guns, launched 1703
- Parfaite 40 guns, launched 1704 (not to be confused with Parfait of 1701)
- Vestale 40 guns, launched 1705
- Portefaix 44 guns, flûte (storeship) launched 1717; designed but not completed by François Coulomb
- Dromadaire 44 guns, flûte (storeship) launched 1717; designed but not completed by François Coulomb

The above list does not include a variety of small craft designed and built by François Coulomb - the three feluccas Félouque (1691), Légère (1694) and Ferme (1695); the barques Légère (1703), Prompte (1703), Sainte Claire (1703), Subtile (1703) and Vigilante (1703); the brigantines Fidèle (1705) and Ferme (1705); also the cargo ships (gabarres) Caillé, Perdrix, Alouette and Fauvette, all four launched in 1717 to a design by Coulomb but not built by him.

== Bibliography ==
- Roche, Jean-Michel (2005). Dictionnaire des bâtiments de la flotte de guerre française de Colbert à nos jours 1 1671 - 1870. p. 223. ISBN 978-2-9525917-0-6. OCLC 165892922.
- Nomenclature des Vaisseaux du Roi-Soleil de 1661 a 1715. Alain Demerliac (Editions Omega, Nice – various dates).
- The Sun King's Vessels (2015) - Jean-Claude Lemineur; English translation by François Fougerat. Editions ANCRE. ISBN 978-2903179885
- Winfield, Rif and Roberts, Stephen (2017) French Warships in the Age of Sail 1626-1786: Design, Construction, Careers and Fates. Seaforth Publishing. ISBN 978-1-4738-9351-1.
