= French ship Foudroyant (1691) =

Ship of the line of the French Navy

History

Kingdom of France
- Name: Foudroyant
- Ordered: January 1690
- Builder: Blaise Pangalo, Brest Dockyard
- Laid down: July 1690
- Launched: 5 March 1691
- Completed: June 1691
- Fate: Destroyed by fire 2 June 1692

General characteristics
- Tonnage: 1,600
- Length: 153 French feet (Note: The French foot (pre-metric) was 6.575% longer than the equivalent English foot.)
- Beam: 43 French feet
- Draught: 23 French feet
- Depth of hold: 19¼ French feet
- Decks: 3 gun decks
- Complement: 650, + 9 officers
- Armament: 90, later 84 guns

Foudroyant was a First Rank ship of the line of the French Royal Navy, the lead vessel in the two-ship Foudroyant Class (her sister being the Merveilleux).

This ship was ordered in January 1690 to be built at Brest Dockyard, and on 9 July she was allotted the name Foudroyant. The designer and builder of both ships was Blaise Pangalo. They were three-decker ships without forecastles. The Foudroyant was launched on 5 March 1691 and completed in June of the same year.

She was initially armed with 90 guns, comprising twenty-eight 36-pounders on the lower deck, twenty-eight 18-pounders on the middle deck, twenty-four 12-pounders on the upper deck, and ten 6-pounders on the quarterdeck. However she was reduced to 84 guns before the end of 1691.

The new ship took part in the Battle of Barfleur on 29 May 1692, where she was the flagship of Chef d'Escadre Ferdinand, Comte de Relingue. Following the battle she and her sister Merveilleux put into La Hogue on the east coast of the Cotentin Peninsula where they were attacked and burnt by Anglo-Dutch naval forces on 2 June 1692.

A new ship was immediately ordered to be built at Brest and given the same name; this was launched in December 1692. However, in March 1693 this ship exchanged names with the ship ordered at Brest in January 1693, so it was the latter which bore the name Foudroyant when launched in November 1693.
