= French ship Foudroyant (1724) =

Ship of the line of the French Navy

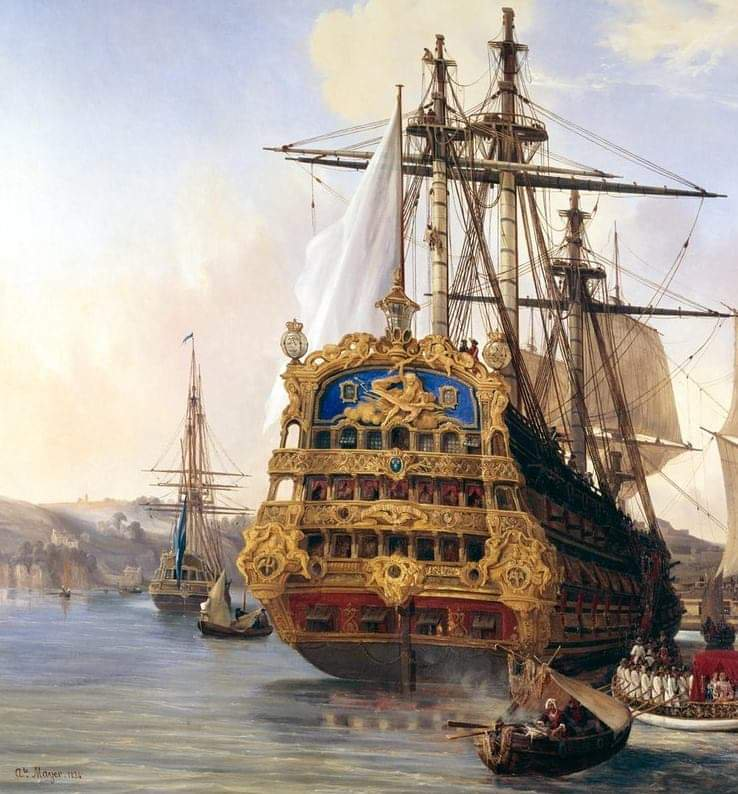
- Portrait of Foudroyant by Auguste Mayer

History

France
- Name: Foudroyant
- Builder: Brest
- Laid down: January 1723
- Launched: April 1724
- Fate: Broken up 1742

General characteristics
- Class & type: First-rate ship of the line
- Displacement: 3700 tonneaux
- Tons burthen: 2400 port tonneaux
- Length: 56.5 m (185 ft)
- Beam: 15.3 m (50 ft)
- Draught: 7.8 m (26 ft)
- Armament: 110
- Armour: timber

Foudroyant was a first-rate ship of the line of the French Royal Navy, designed by Hélie.

Foudroyant never took to sea, and was broken up between 1742 and 1743.
