= French ship Terrible (1693) =

Ship of the line of the French Navy

History

Kingdom of France
- Name: Terrible
- Builder: Blaise Pangalo, Brest Dockyard
- Laid down: August 1692
- Launched: 21 February 1693
- Completed: May 1693
- Fate: Taken to pieces during 1714

General characteristics
- Tonnage: 2,200
- Length: 165 French feet (Note: The French foot (pre-metric) was 6.575% longer than the equivalent English foot.)
- Beam: 45 French feet
- Draught: 24 French feet
- Depth of hold: 19 French feet
- Complement: 800, + 14 officers
- Armament: 100, later 104 guns

Terrible was a First Rank ship of the line of the French Royal Navy.

This ship was ordered to be built at Brest Dockyard on 19 July 1692, to bear the name Terrible, to replace the previous ship bearing that name destroyed at La Hogue in June 1692. The designer and builder was Blaise Pangalo. Pangalo's ship was laid down in August 1692, launched on 21 February 1693 and completed in May 1693.

She was initially armed with 100 guns, comprising twenty-eight 36-pounders on the lower deck, twenty-eight 18-pounders on the middle deck, twenty-eight 8-pounders on the upper deck, ten 6-pounders on the quarterdeck and six 6-pounders on the forecastle. In 1706 two extra 18-pounders were added on the middle deck, the 8-pounders on the upper deck were replaced by 12-pounders, and two more 6-pounders were added on the quarterdeck, giving her 104 guns.

The new ship took part in the Battle of Lagos on 28 June 1693, where she was the flagship of Lieutenant-Général Louis François de Rousselet de Bourbon, Marquis de Châteaurenault, and at the Battle of Vélez-Málaga on 24 August 1704, where she was the flagship of Lieutenant-Général Ferdinand, Comte de Relingue. She was scuttled in Toulon on Louis's orders in July 1707 to avoid being set alight by the bombardment by the English fleet. She was later put back afloat, but in August 1714 she was condemned, and was sold to be taken to pieces during 1714.
