= HMS Norwich (1691) =

Ship of the line of the Royal Navy

History

England
- Name: HMS Norwich
- Ordered: 15 August 1690
- Builder: William Stignant, Portsmouth Dockyard
- Launched: 16 July 1691
- Fate: Foundered, 6 October 1692

General characteristics
- Class & type: 50-gun fourth rate ship of the line
- Tons burthen: 615 ^{90}/_{94} bm
- Length: 125 ft 7 in (38.3 m) (gundeck) 102 ft 2 in (31.1 m) (keel)
- Beam: 33 ft 8 in (10.3 m)
- Depth of hold: 13 ft 4 in (4.1 m)
- Propulsion: Sails
- Sail plan: Full-rigged ship
- Armament: 50 guns of various weights of shot

HMS Norwich was a 50-gun fourth rate ship of the line of the English Royal Navy, launched at Portsmouth Dockyard in 1691. She was one of two 50-gun ships ordered on 15 August 1690 to be built by Master Shipwright William Stigant at Portsmouth Dockyard (the other was the Weymouth).

The Norwich was lost (presumed foundered) with all hands (including Captain Richard Pugh) in a tropical storm in the Caribbean on 6 October 1692.
