= French ship Merveilleux (1691) =

Ship of the line of the French Navy

History

Kingdom of France
- Name: Merveilleux
- Ordered: February 1691
- Builder: Blaise Pangalo, Brest Dockyard
- Laid down: 7 May 1691
- Launched: 19 November 1691
- Completed: April 1692
- Fate: Destroyed by fire 2 June 1692

General characteristics
- Tonnage: 1,600
- Length: 153 French feet (Note: The French foot (pre-metric) was 6.575% longer than the equivalent English foot.)
- Beam: 43 French feet
- Draught: 23 French feet
- Depth of hold: 19¼ French feet
- Decks: 3 gun decks
- Complement: 650, + 9 officers
- Armament: 90, later 80 guns

Merveilleux was a First Rank ship of the line of the French Royal Navy, the second vessel in the two-ship Foudroyant Class.

This ship was ordered in February 1691 to be built - like her sister - at Brest Dockyard, and on 13 May 1691 she was allotted the name Merveilleux. The designer and builder of both ships was Blaise Pangalo. They were three-decker ships without forecastles. Merveilleux was launched on 11 November 1691 and completed in April 1692.

She was initially armed with 90 guns, comprising twenty-eight 36-pounders on the lower deck, twenty-eight 18-pounders on the middle deck, twenty-four 12-pounders on the upper deck, and ten 6-pounders on the quarterdeck. However she was reduced to 80 guns before the end of 1691.

The new ship took part in the Battle of Barfleur on 29 May 1692, where she was the flagship of Lieutenant-Général Charles-François Davy, Marquis d'Amfreville. Following the battle she and her sister Foudroyant put into La Hogue on the east coast of the Cotentin Peninsula where they were among a dozen French ships of the line attacked and burnt by Anglo-Dutch naval forces on 2 June 1692.

A new ship was immediately ordered to be built at Brest and given the same name; this was launched in November 1692.
