= HMS Weymouth (1693) =

Ship of the line of the Royal Navy

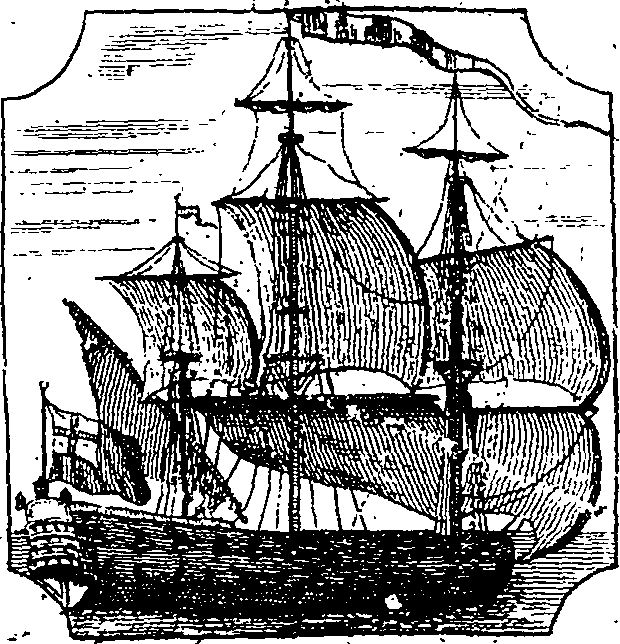
- Etching taken from A voyage (in 1721) to Guinea, Brasil, and the West-Indies; in His Majesty's Ships, the Swallow and Weymouth by John Atkins (naval surgeon) pub. 1735

History

Great Britain
- Name: HMS Weymouth
- Ordered: 15 August 1690
- Builder: William Stigant, Portsmouth Dockyard
- Launched: 8 August 1693
- Fate: Broken up, 1732-33

General characteristics as built
- Class & type: 50-gun fourth rate ship of the line
- Tons burthen: 672 ^{79}/_{94} bm
- Length: 132 ft 4 in (40.3 m) (gundeck) 107 ft 10 in (32.9 m) (keel)
- Beam: 34 ft 3 in (10.4 m)
- Depth of hold: 13 ft 10 in (4.2 m)
- Propulsion: Sails
- Sail plan: Full-rigged ship
- Armament: 50 guns of various weights of shot

General characteristics after 1719 rebuild
- Class & type: 1706 Establishment 50-gun fourth rate ship of the line
- Tons burthen: 714 ^{91}/_{94} bm
- Length: 130 ft (39.6 m) (on gundeck) 107 ft 8 in (32.8 m) (keel)
- Beam: 35 ft 4 in (10.8 m)
- Depth of hold: 14 ft (4.3 m)
- Propulsion: Sails
- Sail plan: Full-rigged ship
- Armament: 50 guns: Gundeck: 22 × 18 pdrs; Upper gundeck: 22 × 9 pdrs; Quarterdeck: 4 × 6 pdrs; Forecastle: 2 × 6 pdrs

HMS Weymouth was a 50-gun fourth rate ship of the line of the Royal Navy, launched at Portsmouth Dockyard on 8 August 1693. She was one of two 50-gun ships ordered on 15 August 1690 to be built by Master Shipwright William Stigant at Portsmouth Dockyard (the other was the Norwich). However, unlike the Norwich (which was completed within a year of being ordered), the Weymouth was delayed until 1693 and - instead of the 123 ft length originally specified - was lengthened to 132 ft 4 in, thus becoming the prototype for the 1693 batch ordered with a design extended to some 130 ft.

Following continuous service throughout the War of the Spanish Succession, the Weymouth was refitted at Plymouth between June 1713 and June 1714 at a cost of £2,572-11-5d. She was docked at Woolwich Dockyard on 13 June 1717 to be rebuilt by Master Shipwright John Hayward according to the 1706 Establishment, relaunching on 26 February 1719, and completed on 10 March 1719. The Weymouth continued to serve until paid off in 1728. On 21 November 1732 she was docked at Plymouth to be broken up (which was completed by 6 January 1733).
