= French ship Admirable (1691) =

Ship of the line of the French Navy

History

France
- Name: Admirable
- Builder: Lorient Dockyard
- Laid down: September 1690
- Launched: 10 September 1691
- Commissioned: March 1692
- Fate: Burnt at Cherbourg on 1 June 1692

General characteristics
- Tonnage: 1,600
- Length: 151½ French feet (Note: The French (pre-metric) foot was 6.575% longer than the equivalent English foot.)
- Beam: 45 French feet
- Draught: 23 French feet
- Depth of hold: 19¼ French feet
- Complement: 550 men (400 in peacetime), + 9 officers
- Armament: 84 guns

Admirable was a First Rank three-decker ship of the line of the French Royal Navy. She was intended to be armed with 88 guns (like the similar Orgueilleux built alongside her at Lorient), but was modified during construction and completed with 82 guns, comprising six huge 48-pounders plus eighteen 36-pounder guns on the lower deck, twenty-eight 18-pounder guns on the middle deck, and twenty-four 8-pounder guns on the upper deck, with six 6-pounder guns on the quarterdeck.

Designed and constructed by Laurent Coulomb, she was begun at Lorient Dockyard in September 1690 and launched on 10 September of the following year. She was completed in March 1692 and took part in the Battle of Barfleur on 29 May 1692; damaged in that battle, she was run ashore at Cherbourg where she was burnt by boats from Englkish warships on 1 June 1692. A replacement for her was built at Lorient later the same year by Laurent Coulomb.
