= HMS Sedgemoor =

Ship of the line of the Royal Navy

History

England
- Name: HMS Sedgemoor
- Namesake: Battle of Sedgemoor 1685
- Ordered: 6 January 1683
- Builder: Robert Lee, Chatham Dockyard
- Launched: May 1687
- Fate: Wrecked, 2 January 1689

General characteristics
- Class & type: 50-gun fourth rate ship of the line
- Tons burthen: 692 tons
- Length: 123 ft (37.5 m) (on the gundeck) 109 ft 4 in (33.3 m) (keel)
- Beam: 34 ft 6 in (10.5 m)
- Depth of hold: 13 ft 7 in (4.1 m)
- Propulsion: Sails
- Sail plan: Full-rigged ship
- Armament: 50 guns of various weights of shot

HMS Sedgemoor was a 50-gun fourth rate ship of the line of the English Royal Navy, launched at Chatham Dockyard in May 1687. She was named to commemorate the King's victory over the Monmouth Rebellion at the Battle of Sedgemoor in July 1685. One of only three 50-gun ships to be built during James II's brief reign (all three completed with an unusual "square tuck" stern), she was first commissioned on 5 May 1687 under Captain David Lloyd, who was still in command (although actually ashore in Dover) when she was wrecked twenty months later.

== Armament ==
All three ships ordered in 1682/3 (all were launched in 1687) were intended to carry 54 guns each - twenty-two 24-pounders on the lower deck, the same number of demi-culverins (9-pounders) on the upper deck, and ten demi-culverin drakes on the quarterdeck. However, each was completed with just 50 guns in wartime service; Sedgmoor actually carried twenty culverins (18-pounders) on the lower deck and thirty sakers (6-pounders) on the upper deck and quarterdeck.

== Loss ==
The Sedgemoor was driven ashore and wrecked at South Foreland, in St Margaret's Bay, Dover, Kent on 2 January 1689. Some of her timbers were later salvaged and used in the building of a new Fourth Rate at Chatham.
