= Action at La Hogue (1692) =

1692 battle of the Nine Years' War

Action of La Hogue
- Part of the Battles of Barfleur and La Hougue
- Destruction of the Soleil Royal at the Battle of La Hogue, 23 May 1692; Adriaen van Diest, c. 1700
Date	21–24 May 1692
Location	Saint-Vaast-la-Hougue, Normandy 49.589°N 1.266°W
Result	Anglo-Dutch victory

Belligerents
England; Dutch Republic	France

Commanders and leaders
(Kingdom of England) Edward Russell (Dutch Republic) Philips van Almonde	(Kingdom of France) Anne Hilarion de Tourville

Strength
14 ships of the line	12 ships of the line

Casualties and losses
Unknown	12 ships of the line destroyed

The action at La Hogue occurred during the pursuit by the English and Dutch of the French fleet after the Battle of Barfleur on 19 May Old Style (29 May (New Style)), 1692, during the Nine Years' War. The pursuing Anglo-Dutch fleet, under the command of Admiral of the Fleet Edward Russell, 1st Earl of Orford, destroyed 12 French ships of the line that had been beached near the port of Saint-Vaast-la-Hougue.

== Background ==
During the Nine Years War, the Anglo-Dutch and French fleets had engaged off the coast of Normandy. Anne Hilarion de Tourville's fleet of badly damaged ships was swept by wind and tide down the coast of the Cotentin Peninsula, pursued by an Anglo-Dutch fleet under Admiral of the Fleet Edward Russell, 1st Earl of Orford.

The French beached three of their most badly damaged ships at Cherbourg-en-Cotentin, where they were attacked and destroyed by an Anglo-Dutch squadron under Vice Admiral of the Red Sir Ralph Delaval. The remaining ten French ships, commanded by Tourville and four of his flag officers, were swept down the coast, to be beached on the evening of 21 May (OS) outside the small port of Saint-Vaast-la-Hougue.

== Action ==
=== Situation 21 May 1692 ===
This was the place where the French had assembled an army, under the command of James II, and fleet of transports, for the invasion of England. Tourville's force joined two of the ships that had retired from the battle with Nesmond ( Bourbon 68 and Saint-Louis 64), which had been beached at la Hougue the day before. The ships were put ashore in two groups on the wide beaches on either side of the town.

On the north beach, between the town and the small tidal island of Tatihou, lay Ambitieux 96 guns, (flagship of Villette Mursay and Tourville), Merveillieux 90 (d’Amfreville), Foudroyant 84 (Relingue), and Magnifique 86 (Coetlogon). With them was the smaller St Philippe 84, and, further out on the shore of Tatihou, the Terrible 80. These ships were covered by shore batteries at the Fort d’Islet, on Tatihou (44 guns in total), and on platforms set up by the army on the north shore.

On the south beach, under the eyes of James and his army at Morsalines, were the Bourbon 68, and St Louis 64, from Nesmond's division, and Fier 80, Tonnant 80, Gaillard 68, and Fort 60, which came in with Tourville. These were covered by the 68 guns of Fort St Vaast, and artillery on gun platforms along the shore. Also, in a small harbour known as the port of La Hougue, which was behind the town of St Vaast and under the guns of the fort, was the fleet of transports prepared for the invasion. The fleet was also protected by a fleet of 200 boats, and three oared galleys mounting 12 guns each. James' offer to station troops on the ships to guard against boarding was not taken up.

=== Preparations 22 May ===
The English fleet, under Russell, started to arrive on the evening of 21 May; the rest of the fleet joined during the night and over the next two days. Russell immediately organised an inshore squadron under the Rear-admiral of the red, Sir Cloudesley Shovell, to attack the French positions, but Shovell later collapsed from wounds received at Barfleur. He had to be replaced by Rear Admiral George Rooke, while the waters around St Vaast and La Hougue had to be sounded, which took up most of the 22nd. The assault did not start until the following day.

Russell also used the 22nd to organise the 3rd and 4th rates of his command to form a blockade line close inshore, while the bigger 1st and 2nd rates were set to organise boats and boarding crews. The Earl of Danby was keen to take part in the action, and appealed first to Shovell, and later to Rooke, to do so. In the assault he was given command of the boat parties that went close inshore.

=== First Action 23 May ===
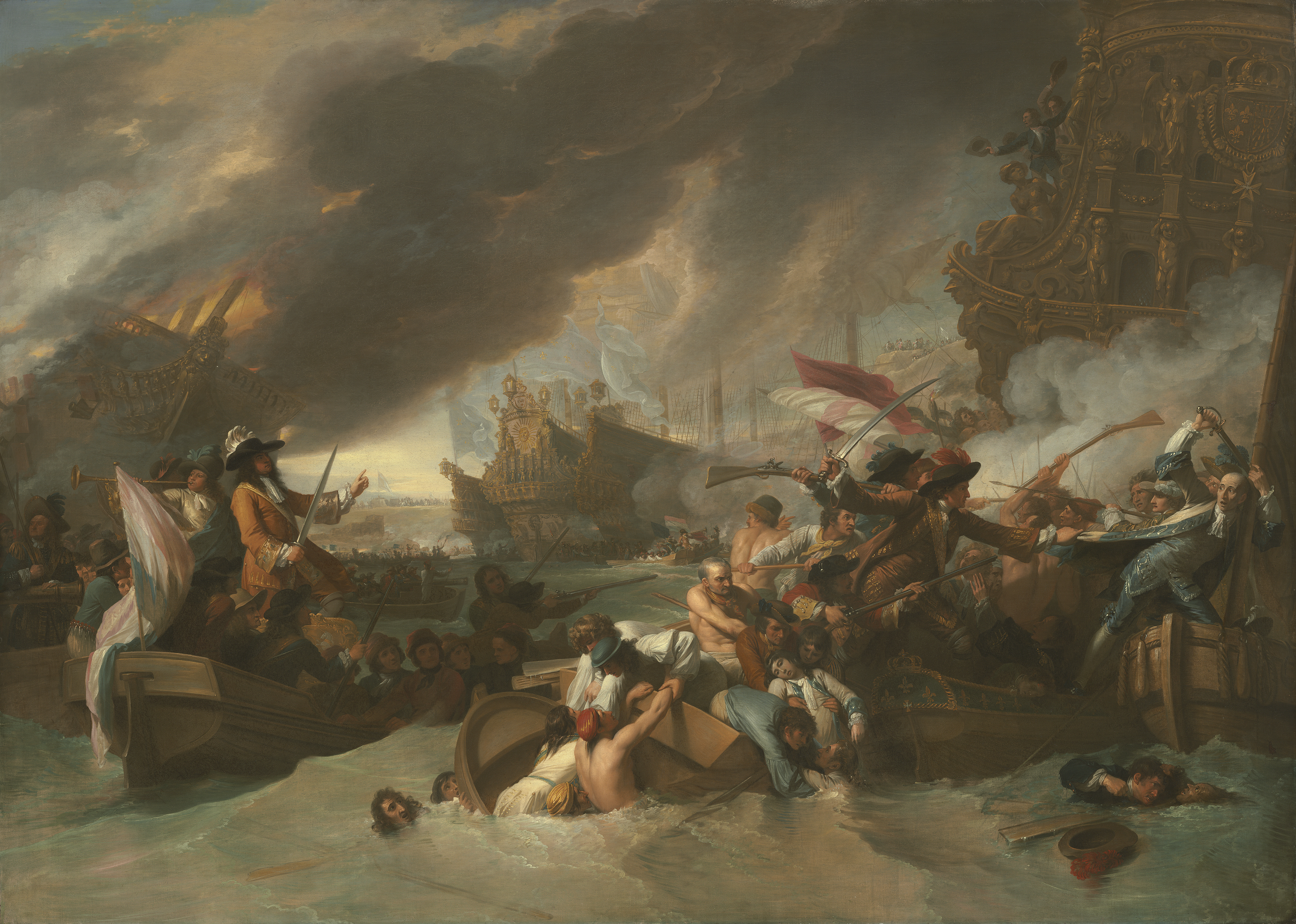
The Battle of La Hogue (Benjamin West, 1778)

At 6am on the 23, the ships of the inshore squadron were ordered to attack the ships on the north beach. After a preliminary bombardment the boats were despatched, and about 8.30 am one of the fireships grappled the Terrible, which was in a more exposed position. Finding her deserted, the fireship captain refrained from igniting his ship, but boarded Terrible and started fires with what material was to hand; for this he was much commended in saving his charge for a better occasion. The Dutch fireship Etna attacked the Magnifique but was sunk by French cannon fire before reaching its target.

Meanwhile, the boats closed with the other ships. They were accompanied by another fireship, which drew the fire from the French batteries; the supporting ships countered, sweeping the French gun platforms, which were too exposed to continue. One boat, from the Eagle, grounded on the shore, and was attacked by French cavalry. In a highly unusual encounter, one of the troopers was pulled down by a sailor using a boathook, before the boat was re-floated.

Resistance melted away as the attack was pressed, and the English sailors were able to board and fire the five remaining great ships along the north beach.

=== Second Action 24 May ===
The second action opened at 5am on the 24 when Rooke again sent in his boats, to attack the six great ships on the south beach. Supported by gunfire from Deptford and Crown, and with close support from Charles and Greyhound, both under oars, the English sailors were able to board and fire all six ships. The French seamen, and the troops ashore, were demoralised by this point, and had abandoned the ships with little resistance in the face of the determined English assault. This episode was seen by James II, who had been watching from his camp at Marsaline; he was moved to remark, with the lack of tact for which he was notorious, “Only my English tars could have done such a deed”.

=== Third Action 24 May ===
Rooke now saw an opportunity to follow up the success with an attack, at high water, on the transports in La Hougue harbour. The boats, led by Rooke, and with two fireships in tow, entered the harbour on the flooding tide, despite gunfire from both the fort and the ships. Both fireships grounded in the shallows below the fort, and had to be burned without result, but a number of ships in the harbour were boarded and set alight, mostly transports, but also a 4th or 5th rate warship and a hulk. Several other of the transports were captured, and carried away when the boats retreated on the ebb, but most of the transports were too far up the harbour to be boarded, and escaped serious damage.

== Aftermath ==
This marked the end of the action, which had been a complete success for the allied fleet; 15 French ships of the line and a number of smaller ships had been destroyed, with minimal English and Dutch casualties. The action also dashed any hope that James or Louis might have had to mount an invasion that year.

== Ships ==
English :
: Perhaps 30 ships of the line, of which
The Inshore Squadron : 15 ships of the line plus auxiliaries

(from the Red Squadron) Eagle 70, Chester 50, Greenwich 54, Swiftsure70, Kent 70, Oxford 54, Cambridge 70,
(from the Blue Squadron) Deptford 50, Woolwich 54, Crown 50, Dreadnought 64, Stirling Castle 70, Warspite 70, Berwick 70, Resolution 70.

French :
12 ships of the line, plus auxiliaries.

1st Rank – Ambitieux 96, Merveilleux 90, Foudroyant 84, Magnifique 86, and Saint Philippe 84
2nd Rank – Terrible 80, Bourbon 68, Fier 80, and Tonnant 80
3rd Rank – St Louis 64, Gaillard 68, and Fort 60,
