= Action at Cherbourg (1692) =

1692 battle of the Nine Years' War

- Part of the Battles of Barfleur and La Hougue
- Destruction of the Soleil Royal at the Battle of La Hogue, 23 May 1692; Adriaen van Diest, c. 1700
Date	21–24 May 1692
Location	Cherbourg, Normandy 49.63°N 1.62°W
Result	Anglo-Dutch victory

Belligerents
England; Dutch Republic	France

Commanders and leaders
(Kingdom of England) Ralph Delaval	(Kingdom of France) Anne de Tourville

Strength
11 ships of the line 3 fireships	3 ships of the line 2 frigates 1 fireship

Casualties and losses
3 fireships destroyed	3 ships of the line destroyed 2 frigates destroyed 1 fireship destroyed

The action at Cherbourg was fought on 21 and 22 May Old Style (1st and 2 June New Style) 1692 as part of the aftermath of the action at Barfleur which had just been fought on 19 May (Old Style) 1692.

== Background ==
During the pursuit of the French fleet after the battle of Barfleur, three of the most badly damaged French ships, the Soleil Royal (of 104 guns), Admirable (90 guns), and Triomphant (76 guns), accompanied by two frigates, of 24 and 20 guns, and a fireship, sought a safe haven at Cherbourg-en-Cotentin. They were beached outside the town, as there was no suitable harbour for them. Russell detailed Delaval, his vice-admiral, to attack and destroy them. Delaval took station off Cherbourg, and so many of the English fleet joined him that his command became unwieldy. Retaining just eleven of the ships with him, mostly the smaller 3rd and 4th Rates, he dispatched the rest, a further sixteen, to join Russell in pursuit of Tourville and the main body of the French fleet.

== Action ==
Transferring from his flagship, Royal Sovereign of 100 guns to the handier St Albans of 50 guns, Delaval mounted his first attack on the morning of 21 May. The French had made serious efforts to protect the ships; they were beached with their masts seaward, to create an obstacle for the attackers, their guns were manned, and they were overlooked by shore batteries, Soleil Royal under the battery at Fosse du Galet, the other two further east under the guns of two coastal towers

=== First attack ===
Sending ships ahead to take soundings Delaval moved in on the morning of the 21st with St Albans and Ruby 50 to bombard the ships and the fort, but the French return fire was so fierce that after an hour and a half he was forced to retreat.

=== Second attack ===
On the morning of the 22nd Delaval tried again, sending the 50-gun St Albans and Advice to bombard the Admirable, while he himself, (now in Grafton of 70 guns), attacked the others, supported by Monk of 60 guns and a group of other 3rd and 4th Rates. However, Monk and her consorts had insufficient depth in the low tide to get in close, and were forced to retire.

=== Third and final attack ===
At one o'clock that afternoon, at high water, Delaval made a third attempt, this time using his fireships with boarding parties in boats. Soleil Royal was hit by fireship Blaze, her captain (Thomas Heath) bringing her within pistol-shot before firing and abandoning her, while Triomphant was burned by fireship Wolf, whose captain (James Greenway) laid her alongside before igniting her. However, the third fireship, Hound, was set alight by gunfire and burned before she reached Admirable, so Delaval led his boats in and boarded her. Beaujeu, her captain, and her crew were forced to abandon her, but about 40 of her crew, mostly wounded, were taken prisoner; the ship was burned, together with the two frigates and the fireship that were with her.

== Aftermath ==
Delaval had achieved a clear success with few casualties, and at later that afternoon set off to rejoin the fleet at La Hogue.

== Ships ==
English :
11 ships of the line, plus auxiliaries

St Albans 50, Grafton 70, Burford 70, Advice 50, Monk 60, Ruby 50.

French :
Three ships of the line, plus auxiliaries

Soleil Royal 104, Admirable 90, Triomphant 76.

== Sources ==
- Aubrey P: The Defeat of James Stuart's Armada 1692 (1979). ISBN 0-7185-1168-9 .
