= List of steam-powered ships of the line =

List of steam powered ships of the line

== Austria ==
- SMS Kaiser - launched 1858, 5811 tons

== Britain ==
See List of ships of the line of the Royal Navy#List of unarmoured steam ships-of-the-line of the Royal Navy (1847-61)

18 built, 41 converted

== Denmark ==
- Dannebrog. Launched 1850. Converted to screw ironclad 1875.
- Skjold. Launched 1834. Converted to screw 1858-1860. Served in the Second Schleswig War in 1864.

== France ==
10 built, 28 converted

Napoléon class

- Napoléon
- Duquesne

Algésiras class (5 ships)

- Algésiras
- Arcole
- Impérial
- Borda
- Redoutable

=== Converted ===
Océan class

- Souverain: laid down in Toulon in 1813, launched in 1819. Converted to sail/steam and entered service in 1857. Used as gunnery training vessel from 1860. Stricken in 1867. Hulk scrapped in 1905.
- Ville-de-Paris: laid down in 1806 at Rochefort as Marengo; renamed to Ville-de-Vienne in 1807, Comte-d'Artois in 1814, and Ville-de-Paris in 1830. Launched in 1850. Entered Service in 1851, Converted to a dual sail/steam ship in 1858, engine removed and converted to transport in 1870. Stricken in 1882; hulk used as floating barracks until scrapped in 1898.
- Louis-XIV: laid down as Le Tonnant in 1811 at Rochefort; renamed to Louis-XIV in 1828, launched in 1854. Entered service in 1854. Converted to a dual sail/steam ship in 1857. Transferred to the gunnery training school in 1861. Out of service 1873, stricken in 1880, scrapped in 1882.

Hercule class

- Prince Jérôme

== Naples ==
- Re Galantuomo. Launched 1850 as Monarca. Converted in 1858, renamed in 1860. Broken up in 1875.

== Russia ==
- Oryol 84 (1854) (completed as screw) - Decommissioned in 1863
- Retvisan 84 (1855) (completed as screw) - Converted to sail 1863, to target vessel 1874, decommissioned 1880
- Imperator Nikolai I 111/109 (1860) (screw) - Decommissioned 1874
- Tsesarevitch 135/115 (1857) - Transferred to the Baltic Fleet 1858-1859, converted to screw 1860, decommissioned 1874
- Sinop (ex-Bosfor - renamed on slip) 130 (1858) - Transferred to the Baltic Fleet 1858-1859, converted to screw 1860, decommissioned 1874

=== Converted ===
==== Leipzig-class (1 of 2 units) ====
- Gangut 84 (1825) - Converted to screw 1854, training ship 1862, decommissioned 1871

==== Imperatritsa Aleksandra-class (1 of 8 units) ====
- Vola 84/92 (1837) - Converted to screw 1856, later become training ship, BU 1889

==== Fershampenuaz-class (2 of 3 units) ====
- Konstantin 74/82 (1837) - Converted to screw 1854, decommissioned 1864
- Vyborg 74/82 (1841) - Converted to screw 1854, decommissioned 1863

== Sweden ==
- Karl XIV Johan, launched 1824. Converted 1854. Scrapped 1867.
- Stockholm, launched 1856, converted on stocks. Later training and accommodation ship. Scrapped 1923.

== Turkey ==
- Peyk-i Zafer, 86 cannons. Launched 1842, converted 1851, decommissioned 1878.
