= Napoléon-class ship of the line =

90-gun ship of the French Navy

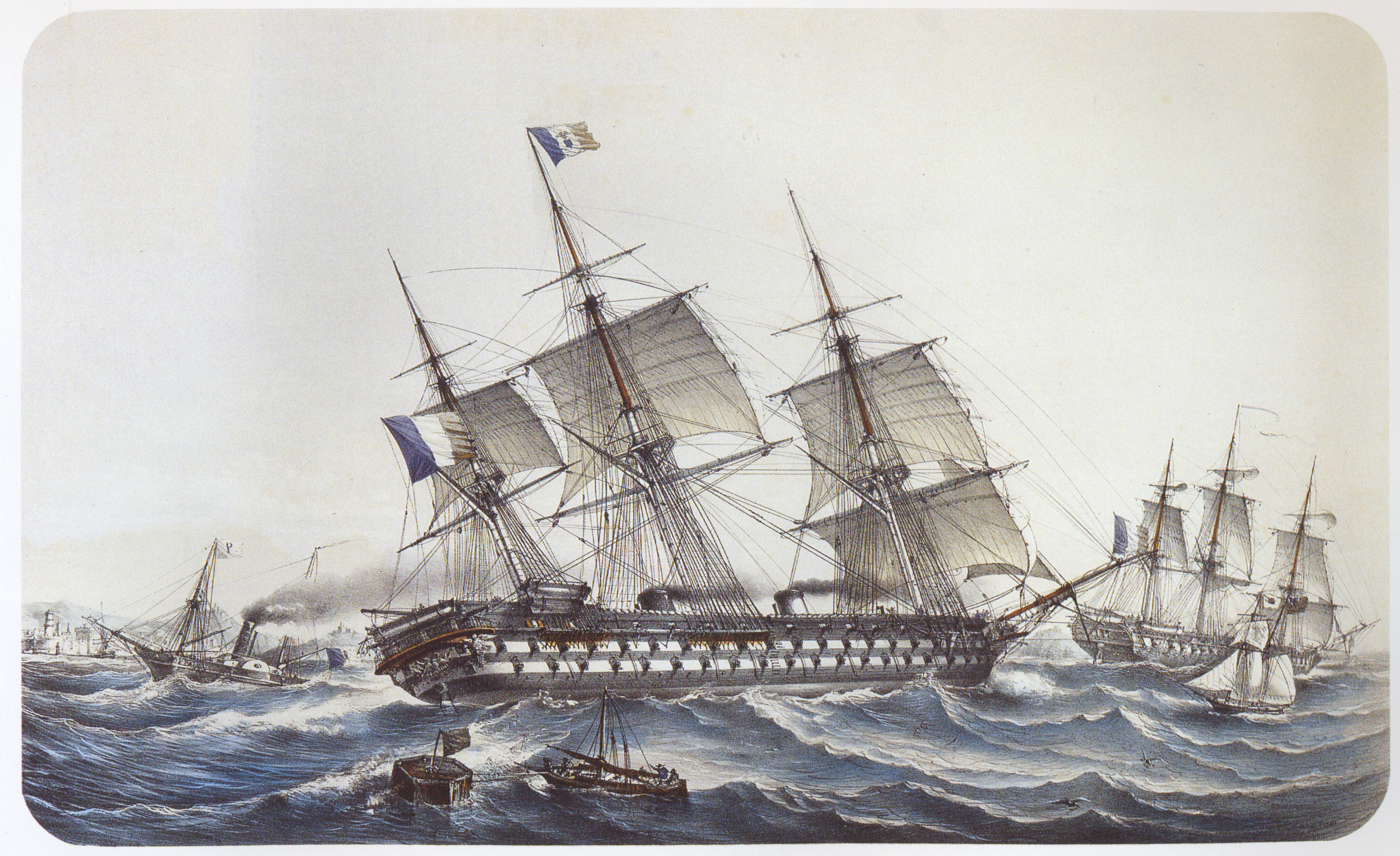
- Napoléon (1850), first purpose-built steam battleship in history.

Class overview
- Name: Napoléon
- Builders: Toulon, Cherbourg, Rochefort, Lorient, Brest
- Operators: French Navy
- Preceded by: Hercule class
- Subclasses: Algésiras class, Ville de Nantes class
- In service: 1850 — 1889
- Completed: 9

General characteristics
- Type: Ship of the line
- Displacement: 5,120 tonnes
- Length: 77.8 m (255 ft 3 in)
- Beam: 17 m (55 ft 9 in)
- Draught: 8.4 m (27 ft 7 in)
- Propulsion: Sail and 2 cyl. Indret geared, 960 nhp (574 ihp)
- Speed: 12.1 knots (22.4 km/h; 13.9 mph)
- Endurance: 3 months' worth of food; 9 days' worth of coal at full-speed
- Complement: 910
- Armament: 90 guns; (32–30 pdr,4–22 cm); (26–30 pdr,4–22 cm); (14–16 cm)

The Napoléon class was a late type of 90-gun ships of the line of the French Navy, and the first type of ship of the line designed from the start to incorporate a steam engine.

Designed by Henri Dupuy de Lôme, the prototype Napoléon displayed such outstanding performances during her trials that a production series was immediately ordered, yielding the Algésiras sub-class. Furthermore, construction of the two Bretagne class 130-gun ships was interrupted: Desaix, whose construction had only just started, was cancelled altogether and replaced with Arcole, while Bretagne was dismantled and entirely rebuilt on principles heralded by Napoléon. Further improvements to the Algésiras type yielded the Ville de Nantes sub-class.

The "swift ships of the line" of the Napoléon class were initially considered of the 3rd rank, behind the 120-gun first rank ships of the Océan class and Valmy and the 2nd rank 100-gun ships of the Hercule class, and on par with the 90-gun Suffren class; however, in practice, most of the ships of the Hercule and Suffren classes had been transformed for steam and sail, losing ten guns in the operation, which made them steam ships of the line of 90 and 80 guns respectively. The Napoléon class was thus quickly promoted to 2nd-rank ships, also reflecting the status provided by their nautical performances.

== Units ==
- Napoléon 90 (launched 16 May 1850 at Toulon) – Stricken 1876

Algésiras sub-class

- Algésiras 90 (launched 4 October 1855 at Toulon) – Transport 1869
- Arcole 90 (launched 20 March 1855 at Cherbourg) – Stricken 1870
- Redoutable 90 (launched 25 October 1855 at Rochefort) – Stricken 1869
- Impérial 90 (launched 15 September 1856 at Brest) – Hulked 1869
- Intrépide 90 (launched 17 September 1864 at Rochefort) – Stricken 1889

Ville de Nantes sub-class

- Ville de Nantes 90 (launched 7 August 1858 at Cherbourg) – Stricken 1872
- Ville de Bordeaux 90 (launched 21 May 1860 at Lorient) – Stricken 1879
- Ville de Lyon 90 (launched 26 February 1861 at Brest) – Stricken 1883
