= French ship Bretagne (1855) =

Ship of the line of the French Navy

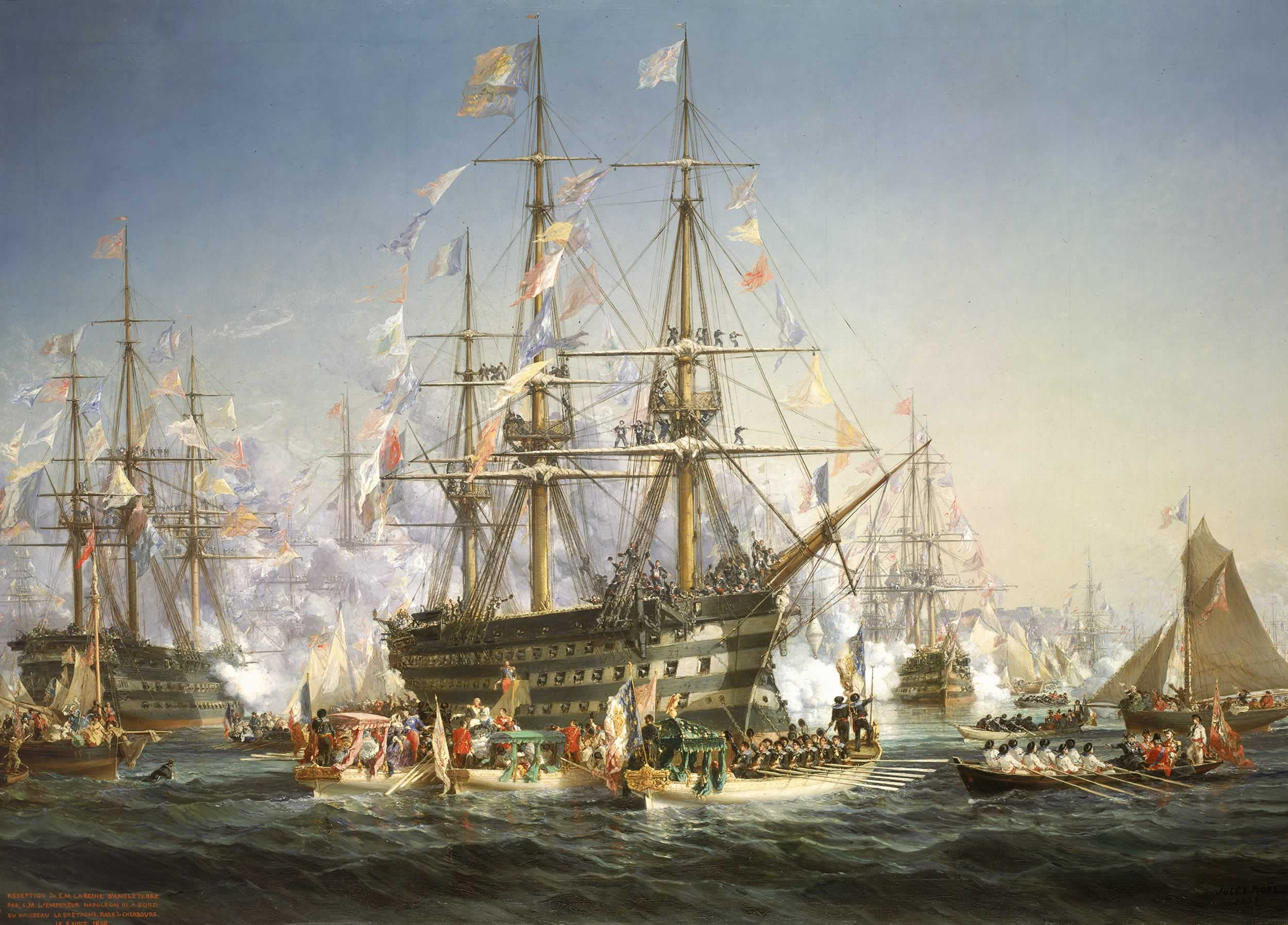
- Bretagne, painting by Jules Achille Noël, National Maritime Museum, London.

History

France
- Name: Bretagne
- Namesake: Brittany
- Builder: Brest Arsenal
- Laid down: January 1853
- Launched: 17 February 1855
- Commissioned: 1855
- Decommissioned: 1865
- In service: 1855
- Stricken: 1880
- Fate: Scrapped 1880

General characteristics
- Displacement: 5,289 tonnes, 6,875 tonnes full charge
- Length: 81 m (265 ft 9 in) (at the water line)
- Beam: 18.08 m (59 ft 4 in)
- Draught: 8.56 m (28 ft 1 in)
- Propulsion: Indret steam engine, 8 boilers, 4,800 shp (3,600 kW), 1 propeller
- Speed: 12.6 knots (23.3 km/h; 14.5 mph)
- Capacity: up to 1,800 passengers
- Complement: 1,170 men
- Armament: Original: 130 guns; lower battery : 18 × "canon de 36" (43 lb shot), 18 × 80-pounder shell gun (223 mm shell); middle battery : 18 × 30-pounder (164 mm shot), 18 × 80-pounder shell gun; upper battery : 38 × 30-pounder; forecastle : 2 × "canon de 50" (56 lb shot), 18 × 30-pounder carronades (164 mm shot); in 1869 : lower battery: 2 190mm rifled guns canons rayés de 19 cm; middle battery: 16 gun 30 n°2, 4 x 160 cm rifled guns canons rayés (mod. 1864), 8 x 160 mm rifled guns (mod. 1860 and 1862), 2x 160 mm muzzle-loading rifled guns, 2 x 140 mm guns; Bridge: 2 x 120 mm bronze guns

Bretagne was a fast 130-gun three-deck ship of the French Navy, designed by engineer Jules Marielle. Built as a new capital ship meant to improve on the very successful Océan class, while avoiding the weaknesses found on Valmy, she retained most of the Océan's design, and incorporated the philosophy of "fast ship of the line" pioneered by Napoléon, with a rounded stern and a two-cylinder, eight-boiler steam engine allowing her a speed of 13.5 knots. The propeller could be retracted to streamline the hull when sailing under sail only.

Launched in 1855, she was too late to take part in the Crimean War. She was decommissioned in 1865, becoming a schoolship for boys and sailors in Brest. Struck from the Navy lists in 1880, she was broken up that year.

== Design and construction ==
Bretagne was the offspring of an attempt to improve upon the Océan class by increasing the beam from 16.24 to 16.64 metres (53 ft 3 in to 54 ft 7 in).

The 1849 budget initially allowed for construction of a new three-decker capital ship named Terrible in Brest, but the ship was cancelled in 1848 to reduce expenses. The 1850 budget then scheduled two ships, named Bretagne and Desaix (in honour of Louis Desaix), to be built in Brest and Cherbourg respectively; the order was placed on 15 March 1851. The mediocre performances of Valmy during her trials led to the Navy shedding the capital ship design of the Commission de Paris and start back from Jacques-Noël Sané's Océan design, with only incremental modifications. In late 1851, engineers De Gasté, responsible for Bretagne, and Forquenot, for Desaix, decided on a reduction of the tumblehome by 20 centimetres (7.9 in) and on a slight increase of the beam — alterations thought safe, as the two last ships of the Océan design, Ville de Paris and Louis-XIV, had had their tumblehome reduced by 23 centimetres (9.1 in) with no ill effect. An initial suggestion to fit the ships with 160-shaft-horsepower (120 kW) steam engines allowing for a speed of 4.5 knots (8.3 km/h; 5.2 mph) was declined as to minimise departures from Sané's design.

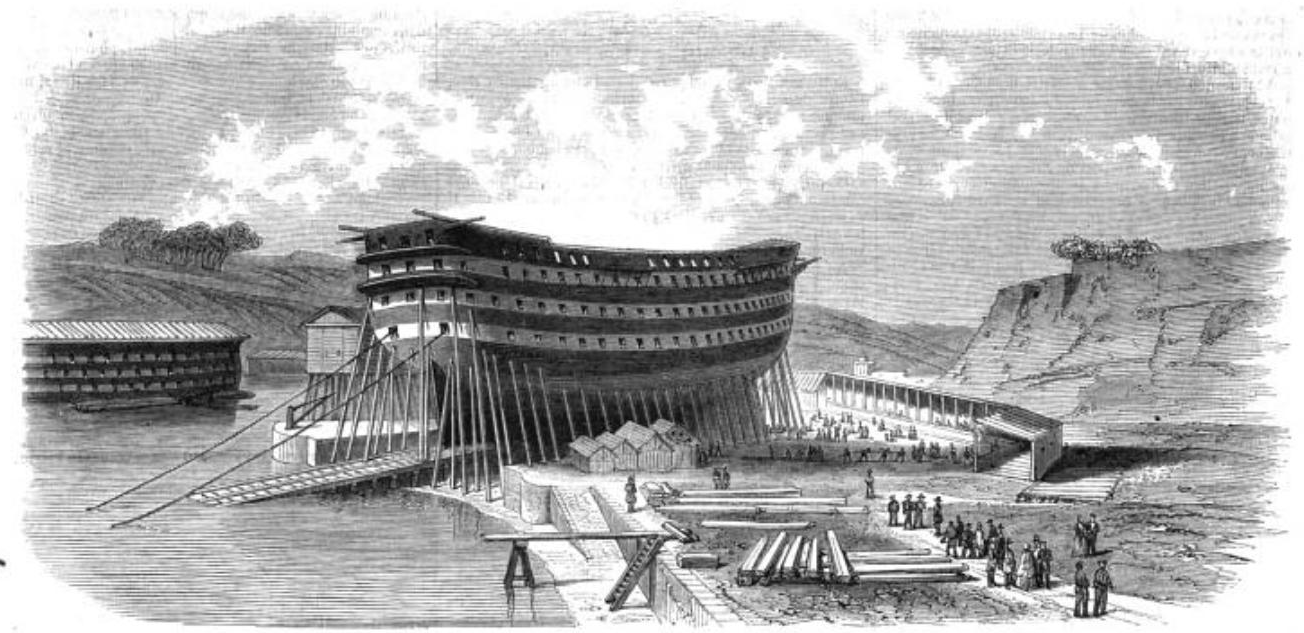
Bretagne under construction in Brest arsenal. Engraving in L'Illustration.

Bretagne was laid down on 4 August 1851 and Desaix on 27 Octobre. On 17 June 1852, the Ministry of the Navy suspended construction and required that the ships be lengthened by 3.43 metres (11 ft 3 in) and that 540 shp (400 kW) steam engines be incorporated. Brest responded to the requirements in September 1852, but at the same point, Dupuy de Lôme's fast ship of the line Napoléon was completing her trials, exhibiting such outstanding performances that on 10 September 1852 the Ministry cancelled the Bretagne class and ordered existing sailing ships to be converted to steamers, using as many existing parts as possible. At this point, the keel, bow and aft of Bretagne had been erected, amounting to the third of the 24 construction steps defined by regulations in ship construction; she was taken apart and rebuilt according to Marielle's plans, which had been approved in December 1852. At the same time, the order for the steam engine was placed. Desaix, whose keel was only beginning to be laid, was cancelled altogether and Arcole, second ship of the Algésiras type, the production series of the Napoléon design, was started instead.

Launching of Bretagne took place on 17 February 1855; in spite of a 2 °C (36 °F), snow and strong wind, a large populace gathered to watch the operation.

The new design gave a length of 81 metres (265 ft 9 in) and a beam of 18.08 m (59 ft 4 in); this made Bretagne 8 m (26 ft) longer and 2 m (6 ft 7 in) wider than Napoléon. With a draught of 8.35 m (27 ft 5 in), the ship had a volume of just under 20,000 cubic metres (710,000 cu ft). The engine, provided by the Indret foundry, occupied a 30-metre (98 ft)-long compartment and was designed for 1,200 shp (890 kW) but could develop up to 3,327 shp (2,481 kW) in peak power from eight boilers, each with six furnaces. Though direct transmission by an axis, it moved a four-blade, 6.3 m (20 ft 8 in) propeller which could be retracted into a vertical shaft, only 1.3 m (4 ft 3 in) wide thanks to the geometry of the blades. The ship carried 590 tonnes of coal, giving her an autonomy of 14 days at 10 knots (19 km/h; 12 mph), and 6 days at her top speed of 14 knots (26 km/h; 16 mph). With three months worth of food for the 1,200-man complement, and one month worth fresh water completed by a distillation device to desalinate seawater, she could stay at sea for 40 days.

The main battery of Bretagne used 36-pounder long guns, the heaviest available calibre, instead of the more modern 30-pounder long gun on which other ships standardised their armament. The aft of the ship was round and featured gun ports, like on Napoléon on her successors. Although she carried 130 guns of various calibres, Bretagne featured no less than 180 gun ports; this allowed the crew to reinforce the artillery on one arc if needed and time permitting, such as before a shore bombardment, and fire up to 80 guns on one target.

The figurehead figured the prophet Veleda, an important character in the folklore of Brittany, with a sickle in hand and a wearing an oak leaf crown. The transom featured the coat of arms of Brittany, carried by two geniī, and the name of the ship underneath. The ship was painted in black, with white stripes along the level of the gunports and copper-red paint underwater.

Decorations of Bretagne
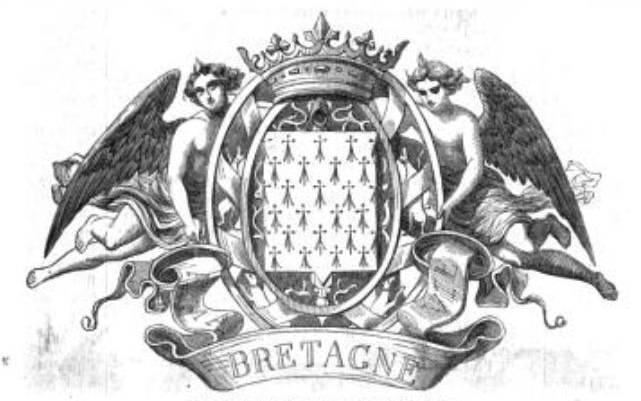
Coat of arms of the transom

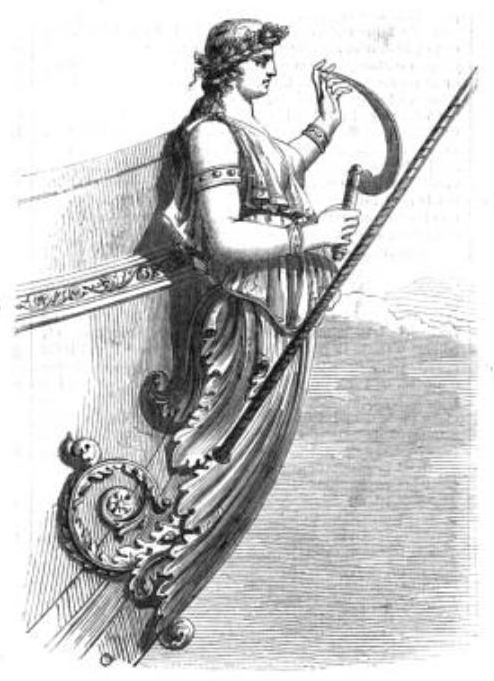
Figurehead of Bretagne featuring Veleda

As completed, Bretagne proved much heavier than anticipated: designed to displace 6,466 tonnes for an 8.20-metre draught, she actually displaced 6,873, yielding a 9-metre draught that lowered the lower battery to only 1.45 m (4 ft 9 in) above water, instead of the intended 1.75 m (5 ft 9 in).

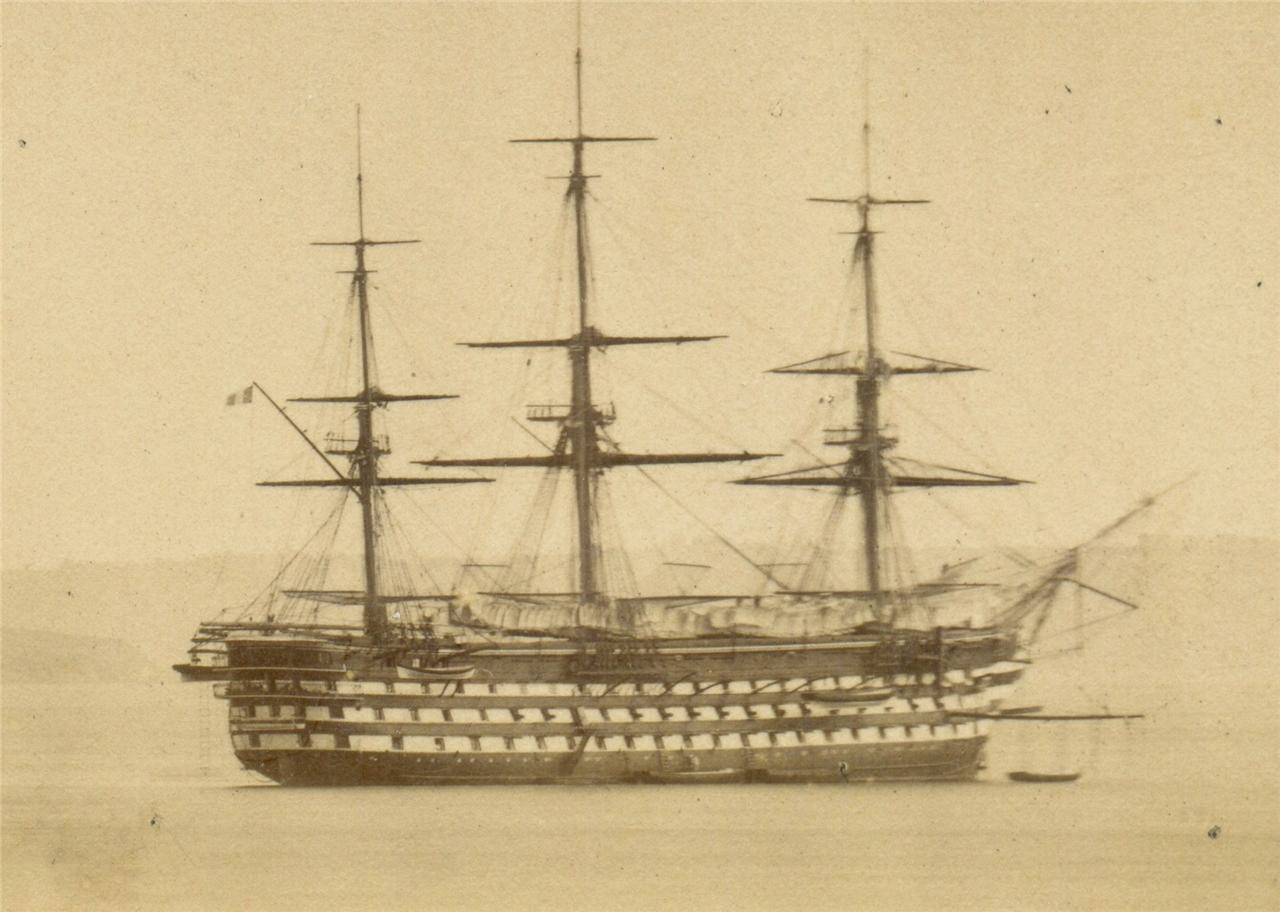
Daguerreotype of Bretagne in Brest, circa 1860

The ultimate increase in French capital ship design, Bretagne increased the number of heavy guns on the lower battery to 18 on each side, from the 15 of the Bretagne of 1766 and 16 on the Océans. In the original design, half of these guns were 36-pounder long guns, as to maximise firepower at the price of standardisation on 30-pounder long guns that typically prevailed at the time, the other half being 60-pounder Paixhans guns. The middle deck fielded 18 30-pounder short guns and another 18 Paixhans guns of 60 pounds. The upper battery was armed with thirty-eight 30-pounder howitzers. Two 50-pounders and eighteen 30-pounder caronades complemented the armament on the deck. This gave Bretagne a broadside of 2,924 pounds (1,326 kg), compared to the 2,400 lb (1,100 kg) of the original Océan design.

In 1869, after the ship became a school ship for the École Navale, this armament was replaced with two rifled 19 cm guns on the lower deck; sixteen 30-pounder guns, four rifled 16-centimetre guns of the 1864 pattern, eight rifled 16-centimetre guns modified after the 1860 or the 1862 pattern, two muzzle-loading 16-centimetre rifled guns, and 2 14-centimetre guns on the middle battery; and 2 bronze 12-centimetre guns on the deck.

== Operational history ==
Completed two years after her British homologue HMS Duke of Wellington, Bretagne became the most powerful warship in the world, but commissioned too late to effectively take part in the Crimean War, which was almost over after the fall of Kinburn in October 1855. Appointed flagship of the Toulon squadron in January 1856, she sailed to the Black Sea to serve during the last months of the conflict, which came to an end in July, and helped return the French expeditionary corps back to France. She was then part of the training squadron at Toulon, cruising between Sardinia and Spain.

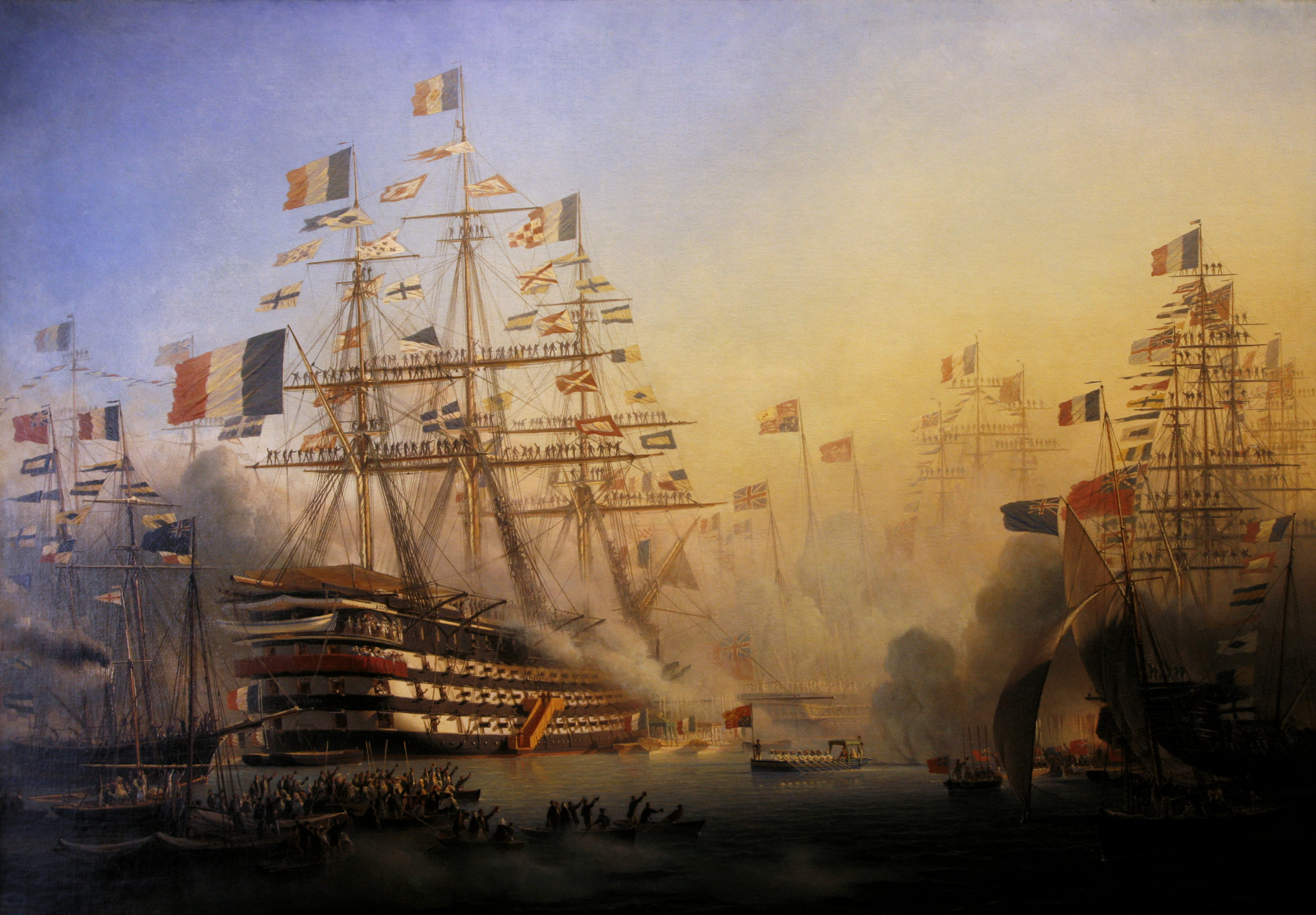
Bretagne saluting Queen Victoria at Cherbourg in 1858. Painting by Antoine Léon Morel-Fatio.

Bretagne took part in the naval parade given in honour of Queen Victoria by Napoleon III at Cherbourg Roads on 5 August 1858. The French Emperor intended to prove to the British that the recent improvements to Cherbourg military harbour were not meant as a threat to Great Britain, and invited the British monarch, Prince Albert and a large British delegation to visit the installations, as a token of good faith. The visit was counter-productive, as the display of power of the French fleet, compounded by bouts of diplomatic clumsiness such as inaugurating an equestrian statue of Napoleon I, irritated and worried the British. After the British delegation departed in haste, Bretagne took the French emperor and empress aboard and ferried them to Brest for the next leg of their official tour.

Bretagne served as a troopship during the Second Italian War of Independence in 1859, and a few months later led the bombing of the Tétouan forts in Morocco, where a cannonball hit her hull. In 1860, she sailed to Naples for the funeral of Prince Jérôme Napoleon. She then sailed to Gaeta in October, under Admiral Adelbert Lebarbier de Tinan, to oppose a Sardinian attack against Napolitan forces, leading to the Battle of Garigliano. She spent most of 1861 ferrying French troops deployed in Syria back to France, before returning to Toulon.

In 1865, Bretagne was transformed into a schoolship for boys and sailors, leading to the removal of her engine. In 1869, the artillery was replaced by an assortment of guns for training use. The 30-gun corvette Galathée served as her tender. On 28 January 1880, Bretagne was struck for the Navy lists and renamed Ville de Bordeaux, exchanging her name and equipment with Ville de Bordeaux, and was towed to Landévennec to be broken up.

Images of Bretagne
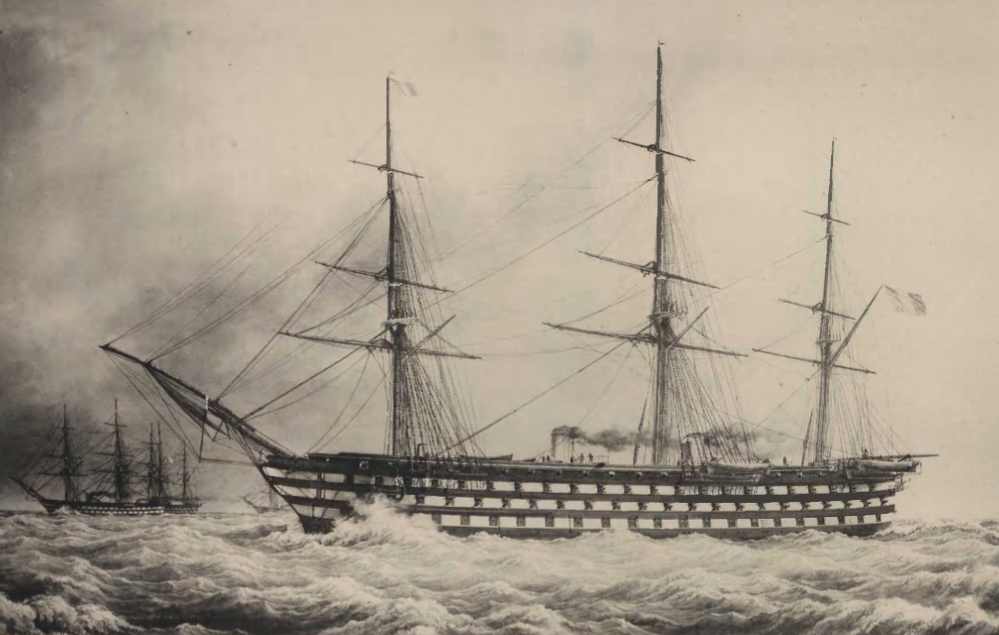
Portrait under steam propulsion, by François Roux

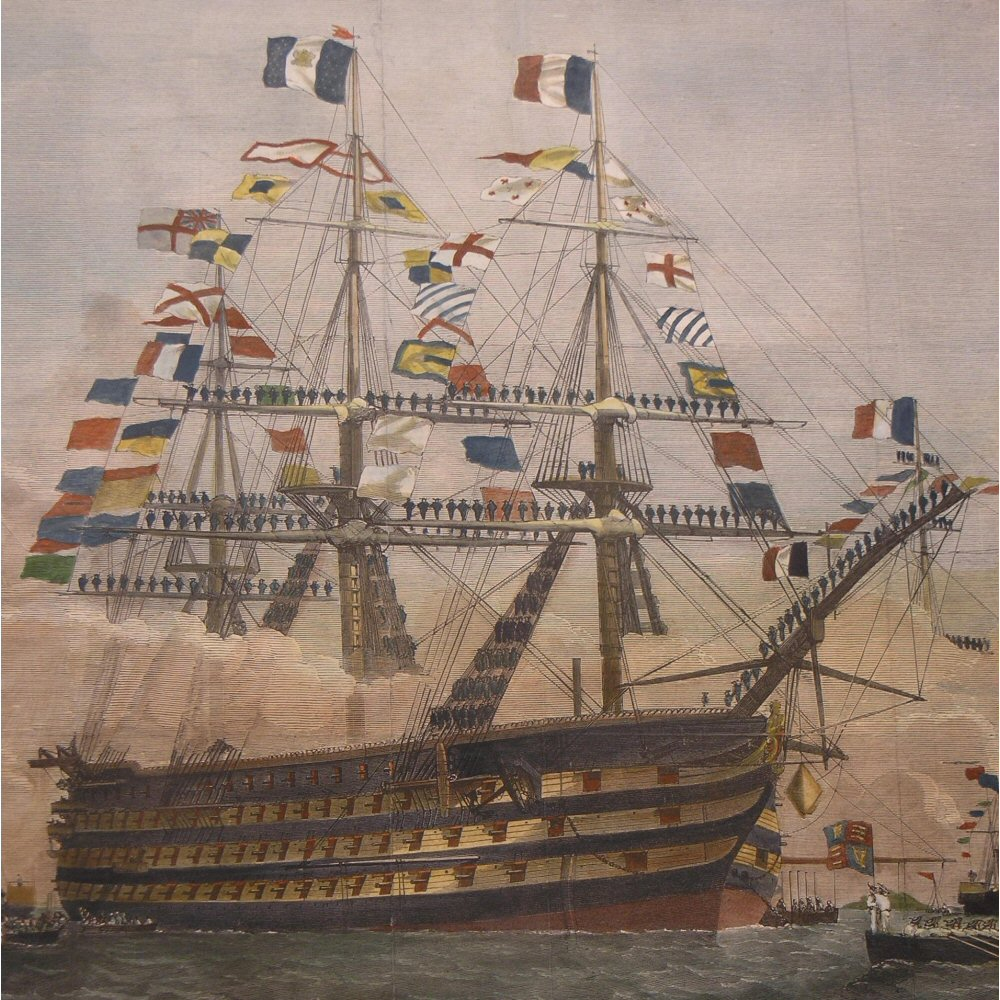
Bretagne manning the yards in honour of Napoléon III

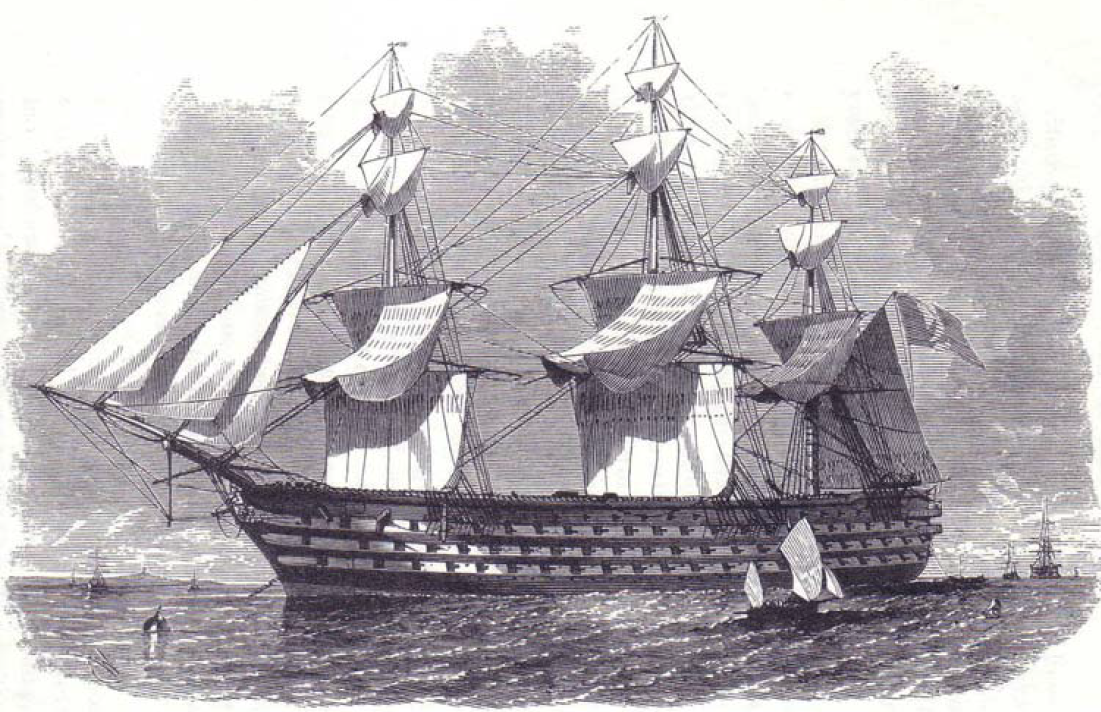
Bretagne at anchor, drying her sails

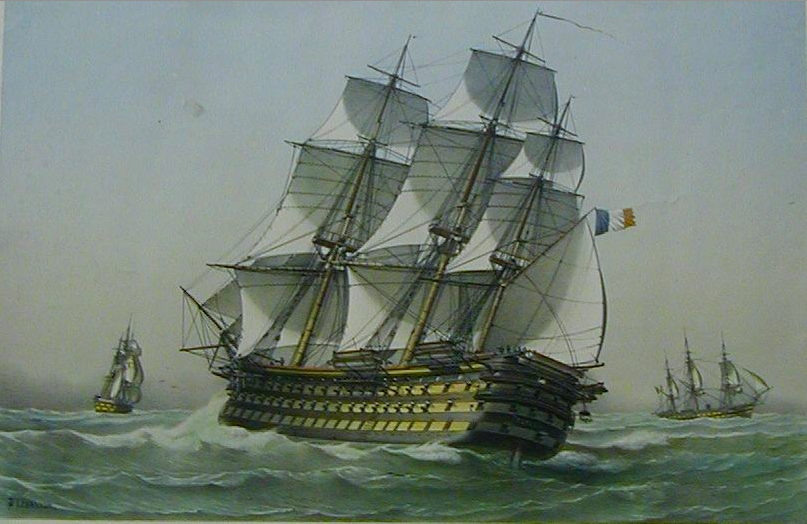
Bretagne sailing close-hauled; the rounded, armed aft is clearly visible.

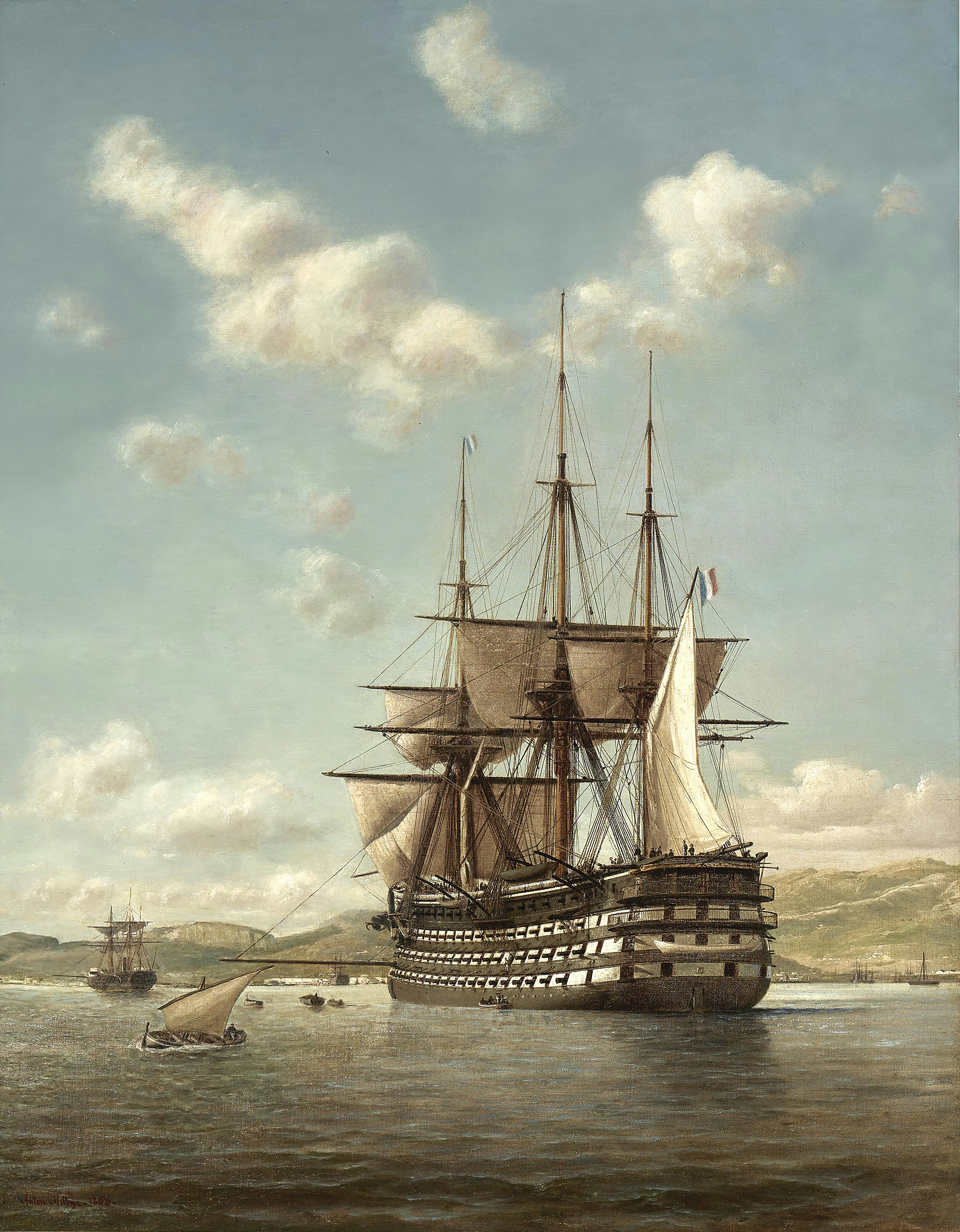
Bretagne off Toulon. 1860 painting by Anton Melbye.
