= French ship Impérial =

Four ships of the French Navy have borne the name Impérial or Impériale:

== Ships of the French Navy named Impérial ==
- Impériale (1805), a schooner launched in 1805 and captured by the Royal Navy in 1806.
- Vengeur, a 118-gun Océan-class ship of the line launched in 1803, was renamed Impérial in 1805. She was destroyed at the Battle of San Domingo and burned.
- Impérial (1811), a 118-gun Océan-class ship of the line launched in 1811. She was renamed Royal Louis in April 1814, Impérial in March 1815 and Royal Louis in July 1815. She was broken up in 1825.
- Impérial (1856), a 90-gun Algésiras-class steam ship of the line.
Ships of the French Navy named Impérial
Impérial at the Battle of San Domingo

== Other ships ==
- Impérial, a Dutch-built flûte that the French Navy captured in 1794 (original name unknown); she was deleted at end 1795.

== See also ==
- HMS Imperial
