= French ship Ville de Bordeaux (1860) =

Ship of the line of the French Navy

History

France
- Name: Ville de Bordeaux
- Namesake: Bordeaux
- Ordered: 3 April 1854
- Builder: Arsenal de Lorient
- Laid down: 26 June 1854
- Launched: 21 May 1860
- Completed: 1 December 1861
- Commissioned: 5 November 1860
- Decommissioned: 14 January 1879
- Renamed: Bretagne, January 1880
- Reclassified: As a school ship, January 1880
- Stricken: 14 January 1879
- Fate: Scrapped, 1894

General characteristics (as of 1862)
- Class & type: Ville de Nantes-class
- Displacement: 5,121 t (5,040 long tons)
- Length: 71.23 m (233 ft 8 in) (waterline)
- Beam: 16.8 m (55 ft 1 in)
- Draught: 8.45 m (27 ft 9 in) (full load)
- Depth of hold: 8.16 m (26 ft 9 in)
- Installed power: 8 boilers; 3,600 PS (2,600 kW)
- Propulsion: 1 screw; 2 steam engines
- Sail plan: Ship rigged
- Speed: 11 knots (20 km/h; 13 mph)
- Complement: 913
- Armament: Lower gundeck: 24 × 30 pdr cannon; 10 × 163 mm (6.4 in) rifled muzzle-loading (RML) guns; Upper gundeck: 24 × 30 pdr cannon; 10 × 223.3 mm (8.8 in) Paixhans guns; Quarterdeck and forecastle: 20 × 163 mm Paixhans guns; 2 × 163 mm RML guns

Ville de Bordeaux was one of three second-rank, 90-gun, steam-powered Ville de Nantes-class ships of the line built for the French Navy in the 1850s. The ship participated in the Second French intervention in Mexico in 1859 and served as a prison ship for Communard prisoners in 1871–1872 after the Paris Commune was crushed by the French government. She became a school ship in 1880 and was scrapped in 1894.

== Description ==
The Ville de Nantes-class ships were repeats of the preceding ship of the line Algésiras class and were also designed by naval architect Henri Dupuy de Lôme. They had a length at the waterline of 71.23 metres (233 ft 8 in), a beam of 16.8 metres (55 ft 1 in) and a depth of hold of 8.16 metres (26 ft 9 in). The ships displaced 5,121 tonnes (5,040 long tons) and had a draught of 8.45 metres (27 ft 9 in) at deep load. Their crew numbered 913 officers and ratings.

The Ville de Nantes class were powered by a pair of four-cylinder steam engines that drove the single propeller shaft using steam provided by eight boilers. The engines were rated at 900 nominal horsepower and produced 3,600 indicated horsepower (3,600 PS; 2,700 kW) for a speed of 11 knots (20 km/h; 13 mph). The ships were fitted with three masts and ship rigged.

As of 1862 Ville de Bordeaux was armed with twenty-four 30-pounder (164.7 mm (6.5 in)) smoothbore cannon and ten 163 mm (6.4 in) rifled muzzle-loading (RML) guns on the lower gundeck. On the upper gundeck were twenty-four 30-pounder cannon and ten 223.3 mm (8.8 in) Paixhans guns. Distributed between the quarterdeck and forecastle were twenty 164.7 mm (6.5 in) Paixhans guns and a pair of 163 mm MLR guns.

== Career ==
Ville de Bordeaux conducted trials in 1861 before being put in ordinary. Reactivated under Captain Delangle de Cary in 1862 for the Second French intervention in Mexico, she served for three years before returning to the ordinary. She was reactivated again, this time under Commander Mer, to bring back the French troops in Mexico back to France in 1867.

After the Paris Commune, Ville de Bordeaux was used as a prison hulk in Brest. In January 1880, she was renamed Bretagne and replaced Bretagne as a boys' schoolship, role which retained until 1894, when Fontenoy, also renamed Bretagne, took her place.
