= Russian ship Imperator Nikolai I =

At least 3 ships of the Imperial Russian Navy have been named Imperator Nikolai I after the Tsar Nicholas I of Russia.

- Russian ship of the line Imperator Nikolai I (1860) - 111-gun steam-powered ship of the line that served with the Baltic Fleet; stricken in 1874.
- Russian battleship Imperator Nikolai I - Imperator Aleksandr II-class battleship captured during the Battle of Tsushima in 1905 by the Japanese and renamed Iki. Sunk as a target ship in 1915.
- Russian battleship Imperator Nikolai I (1916) - Dreadnought whose construction at Nikolayev was interrupted by World War I and scrapped in 1927.
