= French ship Duquesne (1853) =

Ship of the line of the French Navy

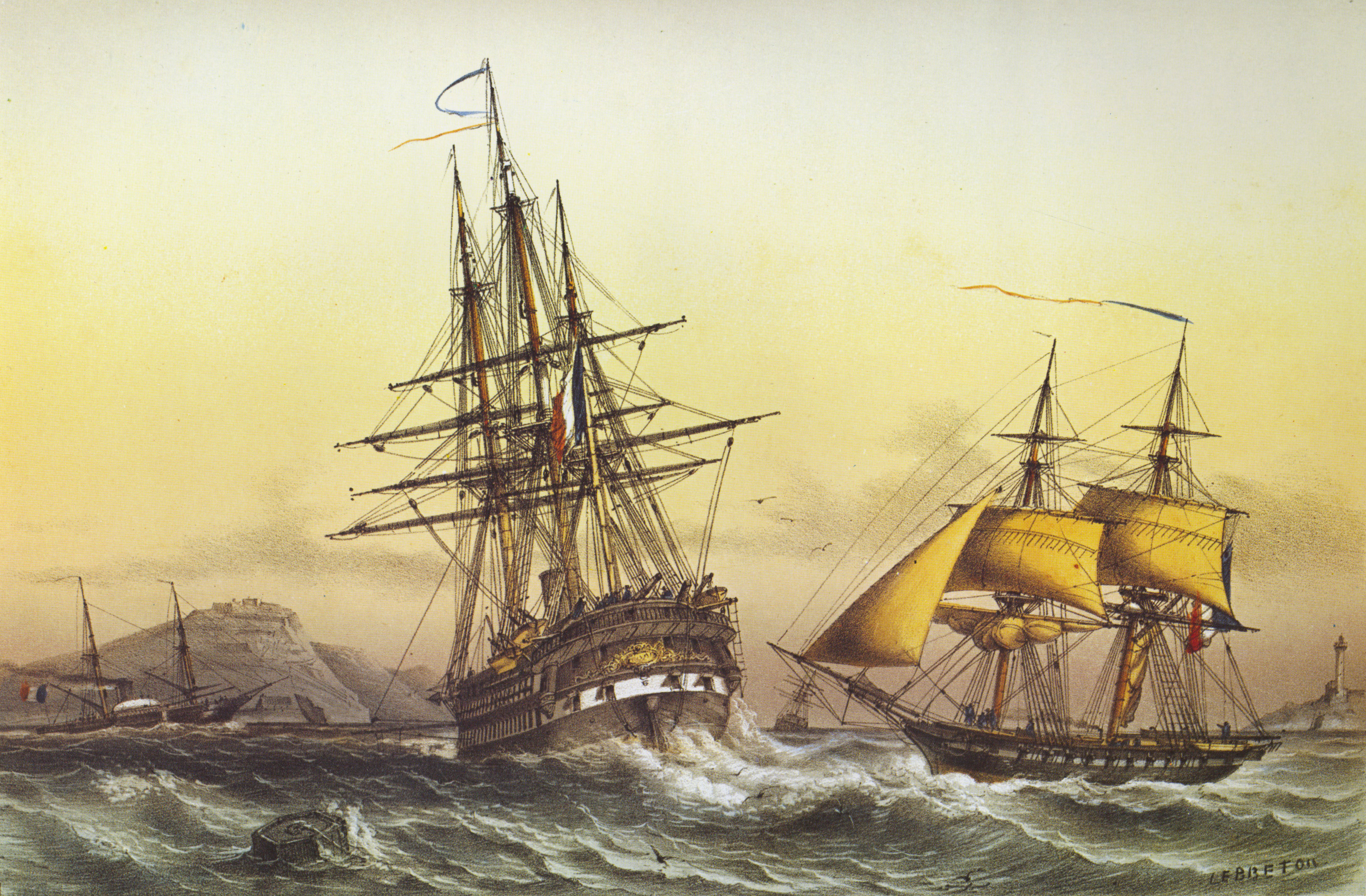
- The Duquesne, drawing by Louis Le Breton

History

France
- Namesake: Abraham Duquesne
- Builder: Brest
- Launched: 2 December 1853
- Fate: Scrapped 1887

General characteristics
- Class & type: Tourville-class ship of the line
- Displacement: 4400 tonnes
- Length: 61.40 m (201.4 ft)
- Beam: 16.69 m (54.8 ft)
- Draught: 7.23 m (23.7 ft)
- Propulsion: Sail; Steam engine, 650 HP
- Armament: 90 guns
- Armour: Timber

The Duquesne was a 90-gun Tourville-class sail and steam ship of the line of the French Navy.

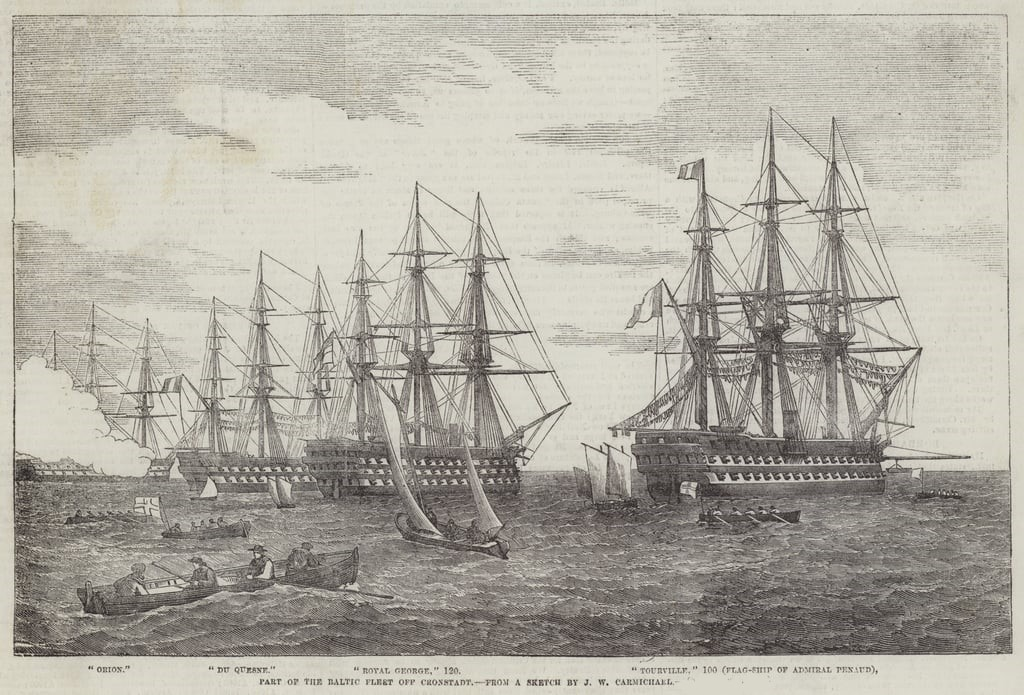
Part of the Baltic Fleet off Cronstadt, ships L-R; Orion; Du Quesne; Royal George; Tourville, Flag Ship of Admiral Penaud. Illustrated London News 1855

She took part in the Baltic theatre of the Crimean War, shelling Sveaborg on 10 August 1855. She later took part in the French Intervention in Mexico as a troop ship.

She was used as a barracks hulk until 1887.
