= French ship Ville de Lyon (1861) =

Ship of the line of the French Navy

History

Second French Empire
- Name: Ville de Lyon
- Namesake: Lyon
- Ordered: 3 April 1854
- Builder: Arsenal de Brest
- Laid down: 30 March 1855
- Launched: 26 February 1861
- Commissioned: 4 November 1861
- Reclassified: As school ship, 1863–1865
- Stricken: 28 June 1883
- Fate: Scrapped, 1885

General characteristics (as built)
- Class & type: Ville de Nantes-class
- Displacement: 5,121 t (5,040 long tons)
- Length: 71.76 m (235 ft 5 in) (waterline)
- Beam: 16.8 m (55 ft 1 in)
- Draught: 8.45 m (27 ft 9 in) (full load)
- Depth of hold: 8.16 m (26 ft 9 in)
- Installed power: 8 boilers; 3,600 PS (2,600 kW)
- Propulsion: 1 screw; 2 steam engines
- Sail plan: Ship rigged
- Speed: 11 knots (20 km/h; 13 mph)
- Complement: 913
- Armament: Lower gundeck: 34 × 163 mm (6.4 in) rifled muzzle-loading (RML) guns; Upper gundeck: 34 × 30 pdr cannon; Quarterdeck and forecastle: 12 × 30 pdr cannon; 2 × 163 mm RML guns

Ville de Lyon was one of three second-rank, 90-gun, steam-powered Ville de Nantes-class ships of the line built for the French Navy in the 1850s. The ship participated in the Second French intervention in Mexico in the 1860s and served as a prison ship for Communard prisoners in 1871–1872 after the Paris Commune was crushed by the French government. She was scrapped in 1885.

== Description ==
The Ville de Nantes-class ships were repeats of the preceding ship of the line Algésiras class and were also designed by naval architect Henri Dupuy de Lôme. They had a length at the waterline of 71.76 metres (235 ft 5 in), a beam of 16.8 metres (55 ft 1 in) and a depth of hold of 8.16 metres (26 ft 9 in). The ships displaced 5,121 tonnes (5,040 long tons) and had a draught of 8.45 metres (27 ft 9 in) at deep load. Their crew numbered 913 officers and ratings.

The Ville de Nantess were powered by a pair of four-cylinder steam engines that drove the single propeller shaft using steam provided by eight boilers. The engines were rated at 900 nominal horsepower and produced 3,600 indicated horsepower (3,600 PS; 2,700 kW) for a speed of 11 knots (20 km/h; 13 mph). The ships were fitted with three masts and ship rigged with a sail area of 2,730 square metres (29,400 sq ft).

Upon completion Ville de Lyons was armed with thirty-four 30-pounder 163 mm (6.4 in) rifled muzzle-loading (RML) guns on the lower gundeck and thirty-four 30-pounder smoothbore cannon on the upper gundeck. On the quarterdeck and forecastle were a dozen 30-pounder cannon and a pair of 163 mm MLR guns.

== Career ==
Ville de Lyon conducted trials in 1861 before being put in ordinary in 1862. She took part in the Second French intervention in Mexico, and upon her return to France, became a school ship in Brest. She returned to Mexico in 1866 to ferry an infantry regiment back to France.

After the Paris Commune, Ville de Lyon was used as a prison hulk in Brest. Struck in 1879, she was broken up in 1894.
