= French ship Redoutable (1855) =

Ship of the line of the French Navy

History

Second French Empire
- Name: Redoutable
- Ordered: 17 February 1853
- Builder: Arsenal de Rochefort
- Laid down: 11 April 1853
- Launched: 25 October 1855
- Completed: November 1856
- Commissioned: 24 November 1856
- In service: 26 March 1857
- Stricken: 15 November 1869
- Fate: Scrapped, 1873–1874

General characteristics (as built)
- Class & type: Algésiras-class
- Displacement: 5,121 t (5,040 long tons)
- Length: 71.23 m (233 ft 8 in) (waterline)
- Beam: 16.8 m (55 ft 1 in)
- Draught: 8.45 m (27 ft 9 in) (full load)
- Depth of hold: 8.16 m (26 ft 9 in)
- Installed power: 8 boilers; 3,602 PS (2,649 kW)
- Propulsion: 1 screw; 2 horizontal-return connecting-rod steam engines
- Sail plan: Ship rigged
- Speed: 12 knots (22 km/h; 14 mph)
- Complement: 913
- Armament: Lower gundeck: 18 × 36 pdr cannon; 16 × 223.3 mm (8.8 in) Paixhans guns; Upper gundeck: 34 × 30 pdr cannon; Quarterdeck and forecastle: 20 × 163 mm (6.4 in) Paixhans guns; 2 × 163 mm rifled muzzle-loading guns

Redoubtable was one of five second-rank, 90-gun, steam-powered Algésiras-class ships of the line built for the French Navy in the 1850s. The ship participated in the Second Italian War of Independence in 1859 and was scrapped in 1873–1874.

== Description ==
The Algésiras-class ships were repeats of the pioneering ship of the line Napoléon and were also designed by naval architect Henri Dupuy de Lôme. They had a length at the waterline of 71.23 metres (233 ft 8 in), a beam of 16.8 metres (55 ft 1 in) and a depth of hold of 8.16 metres (26 ft 9 in). The ships displaced 5,121 tonnes (5,040 long tons) and had a draught of 8.45 metres (27 ft 9 in) at deep load. Their crew numbered 913 officers and ratings.

The primary difference between Napoléon and the Algésiras class was that the boilers of the latter ships were moved forward of the engines. They were powered by a pair of four-cylinder horizontal-return connecting-rod steam engines that drove the single propeller shaft using steam provided by eight boilers. The engines were rated at 910 nominal horsepower and produced 3,602 metric horsepower (2,649 kW). The ships were fitted with three masts and ship rigged.

The armament of the Algésiras-class ships consisted of eighteen 36-pounder (174.8 mm (6.9 in)) smoothbore cannon and sixteen 223.3 mm (8.8 in) Paixhans guns on the lower gundeck and thirty-four 30-pounder 164.7 mm (6.5 in) cannon on the upper gundeck. On the quarterdeck and forecastle were twenty 163 mm (6.4 in) Paixhans guns and a pair of 163 mm rifled muzzle-loading guns.

== Career ==
Redoutable took part in the Second Italian War of Independence under Captain Vincent Moulac. In 1860, she served off Beirut with Donawerth.

She was decommissioned in 1865, was hulked in Brest and used as barracks until she was broken up in 1874.
