= Ville de Nantes-class ship of the line =

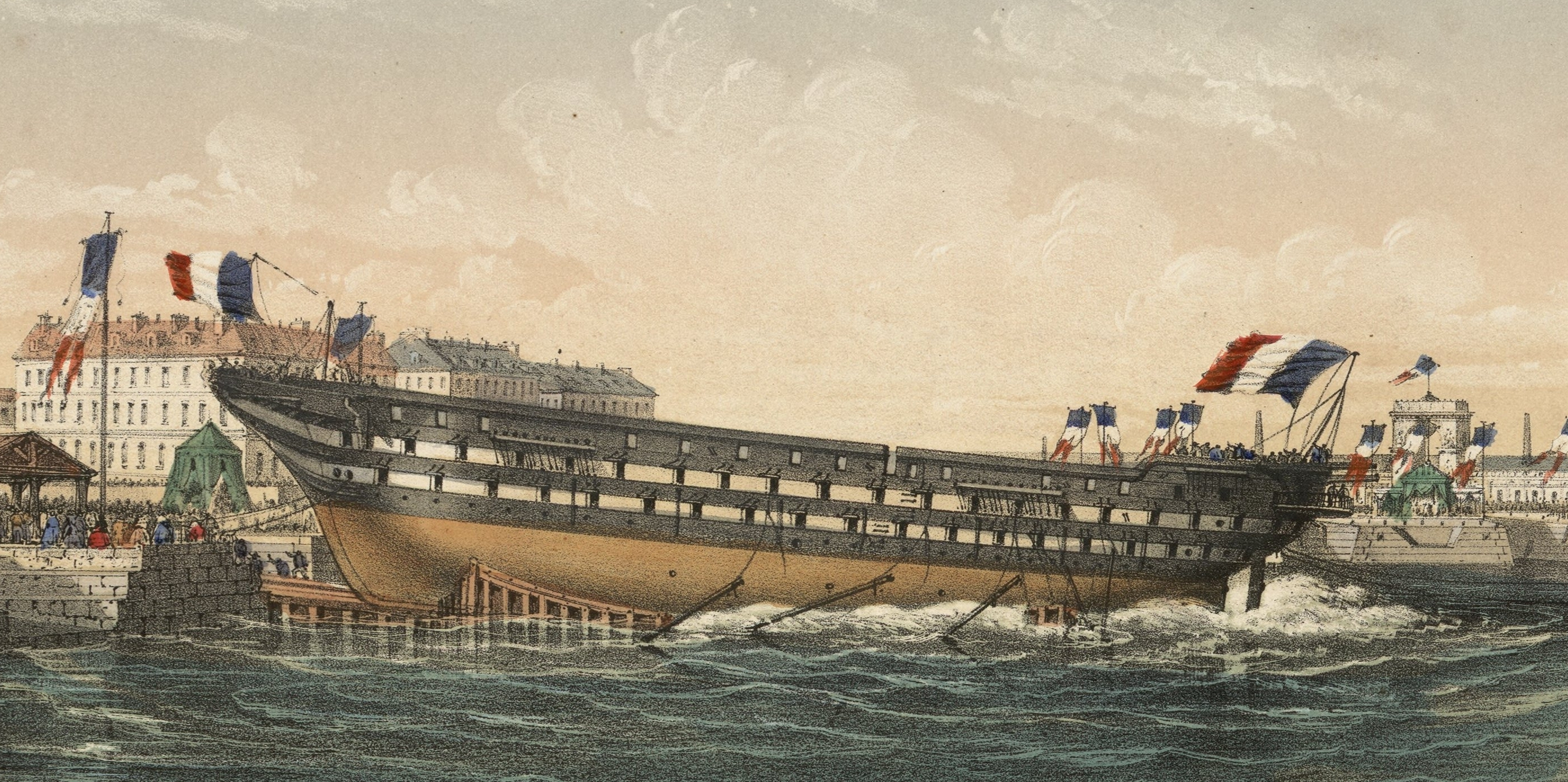
- Launching of Ville de Nantes, by Louis Le Breton

Class overview
- Name: Ville de Nantes
- Operators: French Navy
- Preceded by: Algésiras-class ship of the line
- Built: 1854–1861
- In service: 1860–1894
- In commission: 1860–1879
- Completed: 3

General characteristics (as built)
- Type: 90-gun ship of the line
- Displacement: 5,121 t (5,040 long tons)
- Length: 71.23–71.76 m (233 ft 8 in – 235 ft 5 in) (waterline)
- Beam: 16.8 m (55 ft 1 in)
- Draught: 8.45 m (27 ft 9 in) (full load)
- Depth of hold: 8.16 m (26 ft 9 in)
- Installed power: 8 boilers; 3,600 PS (2,600 kW)
- Propulsion: 1 screw; 2 steam engines
- Sail plan: Ship rigged
- Speed: 11–12 knots (20–22 km/h; 13–14 mph)
- Complement: 913
- Armament: (Ville de Nantes, 1863); Lower gundeck: 24 × 30 pdr cannon; 10 × 163 mm (6.4 in) rifled muzzle-loading (RML) guns; Upper gundeck: 24 × 30 pdr cannon; 10 × 223.3 mm (8.8 in) Paixhans guns; Quarterdeck and forecastle: 6 × 163 mm Paixhans guns; 4 × 163 mm RML guns

The Ville de Nantes class consisted of three second-rank, 90-gun, steam-powered ships of the line built for the French Navy in the 1850s. Most of the ships participated in the Second French intervention in Mexico in the 1860s and spent extensive amounts of time in reserve. In 1871–1872 the sister ships were used as prison ships after the Paris Commune was crushed by the French government in 1871.

== Description ==
The Ville de Nantes-class ships were repeats of the preceding ship of the line Algésiras class and were also designed by naval architect Henri Dupuy de Lôme. They had a length at the waterline of 71.23–71.76 metres (233 ft 8 in – 235 ft 5 in), a beam of 16.8 metres (55 ft 1 in) and a depth of hold of 8.16 metres (26 ft 9 in). The ships displaced 5,121 tonnes (5,040 long tons) and had a draught of 8.45 metres (27 ft 9 in) at deep load. Their crew numbered 913 officers and ratings.

The Ville de Nantes class were powered by a pair of four-cylinder steam engines that drove the single propeller shaft using steam provided by eight boilers. The engines were rated at 900 nominal horsepower and produced 3,600 indicated horsepower (3,600 PS; 2,700 kW) for speeds of 11–12 knots (20–22 km/h; 13–14 mph). The ships were fitted with three masts and ship rigged with a sail area of 2,730 square metres (29,400 sq ft).

Each of the Ville de Nantes-class ships was armed with a unique mixture of 30-pounder (164.7 mm (6.5 in)) smoothbore cannon, 163 mm (6.4 in) rifled muzzle-loading (RML) guns as well as 164.7 mm and 223.3 mm (8.8 in) Paixhans guns. The guns were distributed between the upper and lower gundecks and the quarterdeck and forecastle.

== Ships ==
| Name | Builder | Laid down | Launched | Commissioned | Fate |
|---|---|---|---|---|---|
| Ville de Nantes | Arsenal de Cherbourg | July 1856 | 7 August 1858 | 25 October 1860 | Scrapped, 1887 |
| Ville de Lyon | Arsenal de Brest | 30 March 1855 | 26 February 1861 | 4 November 1861 | Scrapped, 1885 |
| Ville de Bordeaux | Arsenal de Lorient | 26 June 1854 | 21 May 1860 | 5 November 1860 | Scrapped, 1894 |

== See also ==
- List of ships of the line of France

== Bibliography ==
- Roche, Jean-Michel (2005). Dictionnaire des bâtiments de la flotte de guerre française de Colbert à nos jours. Vol. Tome I: 1671–1870. ISBN 978-2-9525917-0-6. OCLC 165892922.
- Winfield, Rif & Roberts, Stephen S. (2015). French Warships in the Age of Sail 1786–1861: Design, Construction, Careers and Fates. Barnsley, UK: Seaforth Publishing. ISBN 978-1-84832-204-2.
