= French ship Louis XIV =

Ship of the line of the French Navy

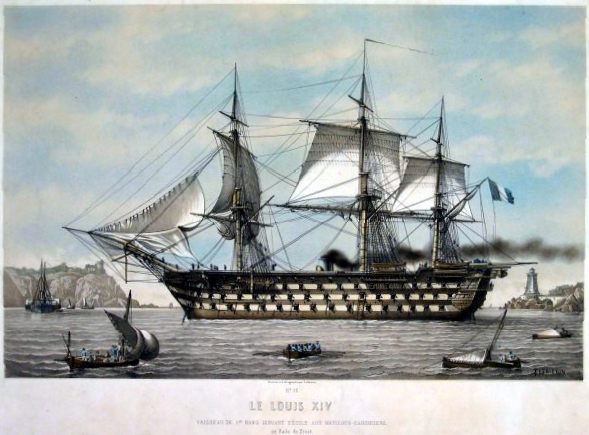
- Engraving by Lebreton showing Louis XIV as a naval school

History

France
- Name: Louis XIV
- Namesake: Louis XIV
- Builder: Arsenal de Rochefort
- Laid down: 1811
- Launched: 28 February 1854
- Completed: September 1854
- Decommissioned: 1873
- Stricken: 3 May 1880
- Reinstated: sail/steam ship in 1857
- Fate: Broken up, 1882

General characteristics
- Class & type: Océan-class ship of the line
- Displacement: 5,095 tonneaux
- Tons burthen: 2,794–2,930 port tonneaux
- Length: 63.83 m (209 ft 5 in) (gun deck)
- Beam: 16.4 m (53 ft 10 in)
- Draught: 8.14 m (26 ft 8 in)
- Depth of hold: 8.12 m (26 ft 8 in)
- Propulsion: sail, 3,250 m^{2} (35,000 sq ft)
- Sail plan: full-rigged ship
- Complement: 1,130
- Armament: 76 muzzle-loading, smoothbore guns; Lower gundeck: 24 × 30-pounder long guns, 4 × 22 cm (8.7 in) long Paixhans guns; Upper gundeck: 24 × 30-pounder short guns, 4 × 22 cm (8.7 in) short Paixhans guns; Forecastle & Quarterdeck: 4 × 30-pounder long guns, 12 × 16 cm (6.3 in) Paixhans guns

Louis XIV was a first-rate 118-gun Océan-class ship of the line built for the French Navy during the 1810s. Not completed until 1854, the ship participated in the Crimean War of 1854–1855. She was converted to steam power in 1857.

== Description ==
The later Océan-class ships had a length of 63.83 metres (209 ft 5 in) at the gun deck a beam of 16.4 metres (53 ft 10 in) and a depth of hold of 8.12 metres (26 ft 8 in). The ships displaced 5095 tonneaux and had a mean draught of 8.15 metres (26 ft 9 in). They had a tonnage of 2,794–2,930 port tonneaux. Their crew numbered 1,130 officers and ratings. They were fitted with three masts and ship rigged with a sail area of 3,250 square metres (35,000 sq ft).

The muzzle-loading, smoothbore armament of Louis XIV consisted of twenty-eight 30-pounder long guns and four 22 cm (8.7 in) Paixhans guns on the lower gun deck, Thirty 30-pounder short guns and four 22 cm Paixhans guns on the middle gun deck, and on the upper gun deck were thirty-four 30-pounder short guns. On the quarterdeck and forecastle were a total of a dozen very short 30-pounder guns.

== Construction and career ==
Louis XIV was laid down at the Arsenal de Rochefort in April 1811 with the name Tonnant and was renamed Louis XIV in 1828. The ship remained on the stocks until she was launched on 28 February 1854, commissioned on 24 March and completed in September. On 28 January 1855, she departed Toulon to take part in the Siege of Sevastopol as a transport ship. From September 1856 to 1857, she was converted to combined sail/steam propulsion in Brest harbour, using machinery supplied by Robert Napier & Sons of Glasgow, to reenter service on 25 October 1857.

Louis XIV was decommissioned between 1858 and 1861, and was affected to the École Navale as a gunnery training ship from 1861 to 1865. That year, she was sent to Toulon. In 1870, her crew was sent to Paris to defend the city against the advancing Prussian armies. Training resumed in November 1870. In 1873, Louis XIV was decommissioned again. She was struck on 3 May 1880, and sold for scrap in 1882.

Representations of Louis XIV
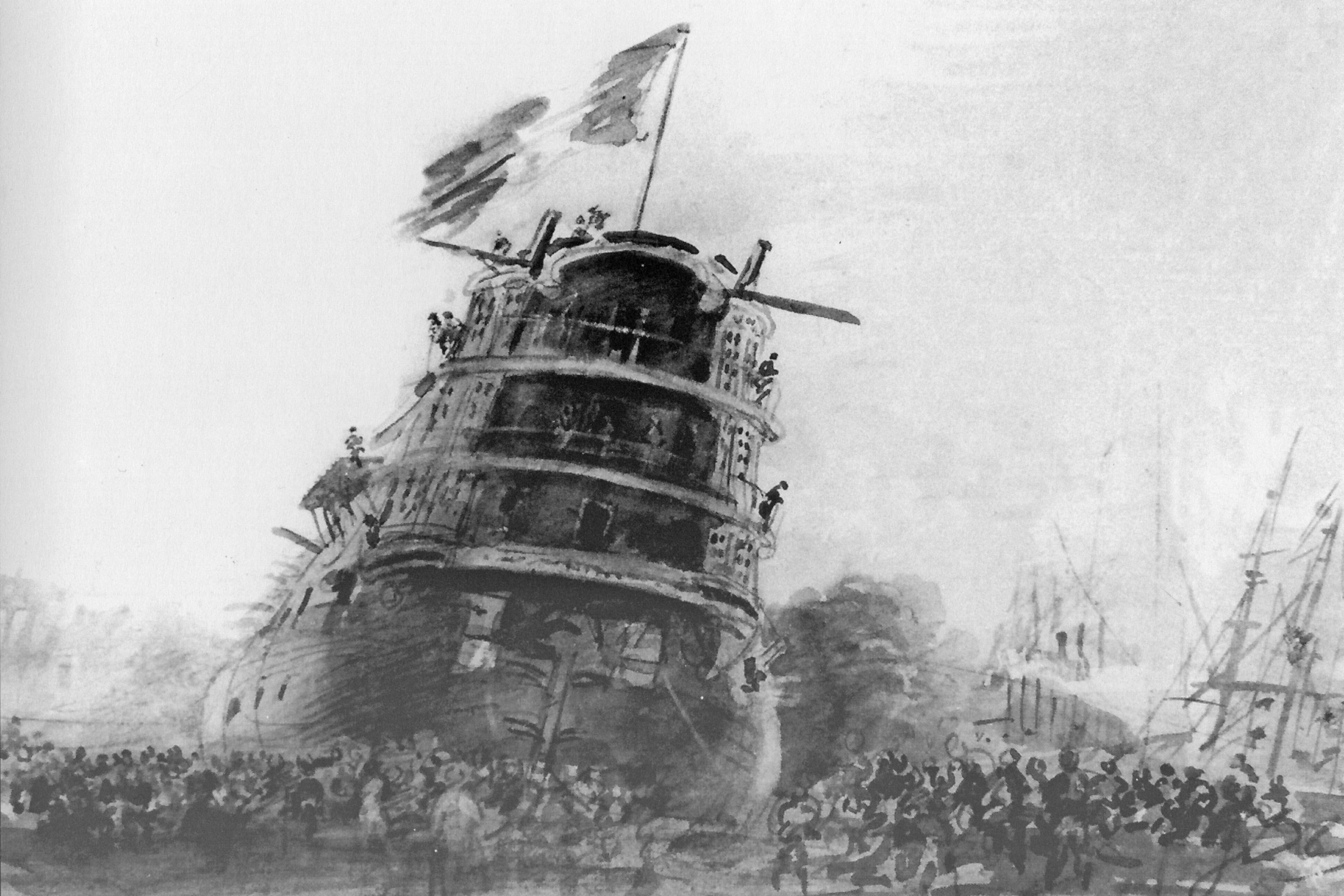
Louis XIV nearing completion

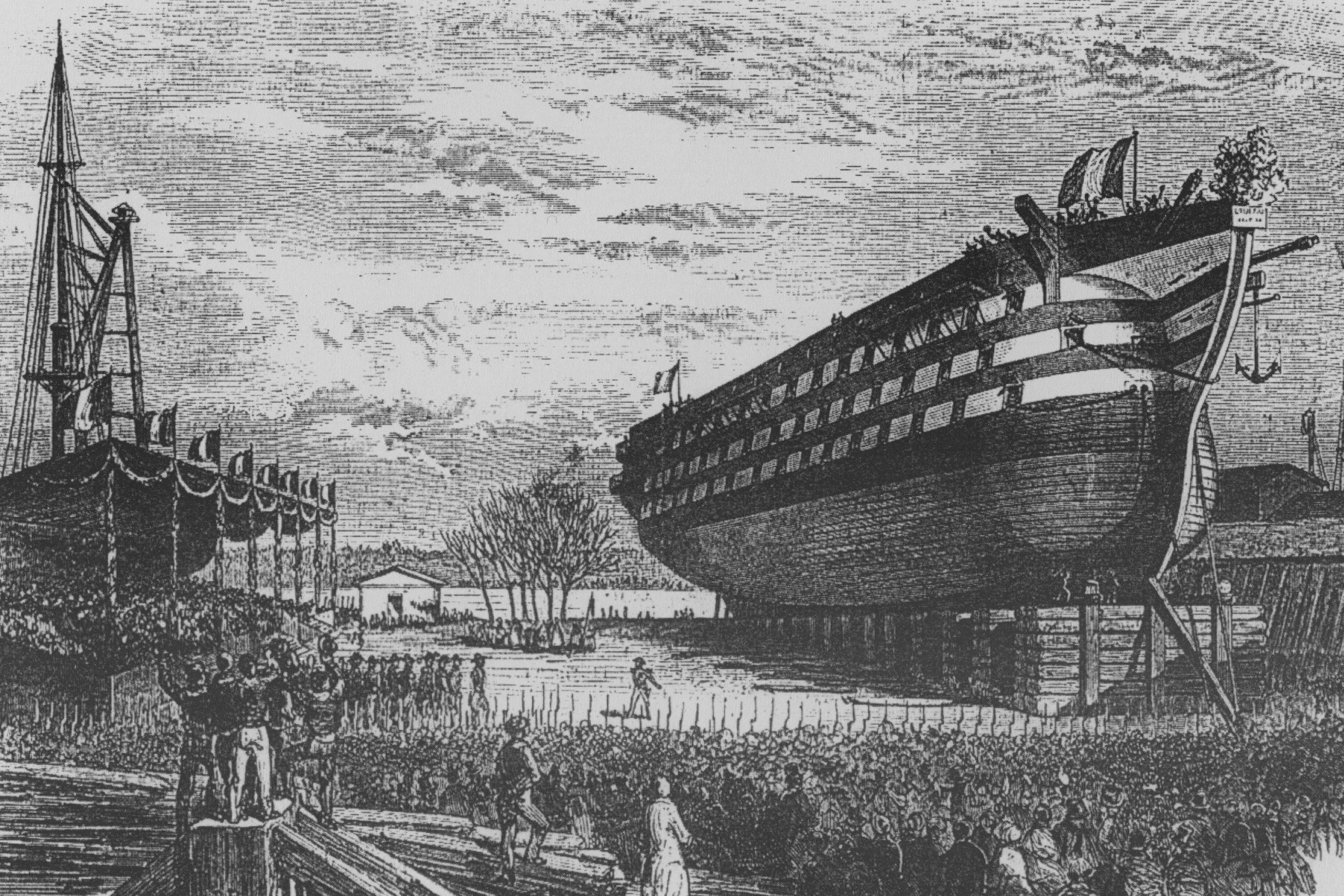
Engraving of the launch

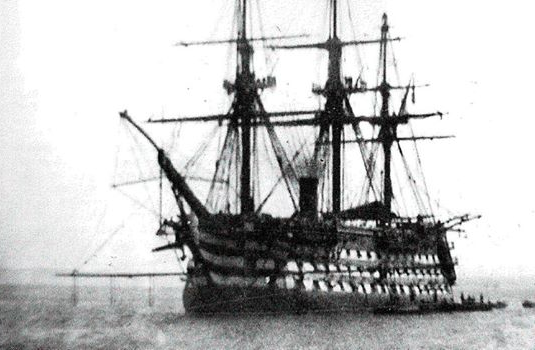
Louis XIV in the roads of Brest in 1865, after conversion to a steam ship of the line. Photograph by Jules Maréchal.

== Bibliography ==
- Jones, Colin (1996). "Entente Cordiale, 1865". In McLean, David & Preston, Antony (eds.). Warship 1996. London: Conway Maritime Press. ISBN 0-85177-685-X.
- Roche, Jean-Michel (2005). Dictionnaire des bâtiments de la flotte de guerre française de Colbert à nos jours [Dictionary of French Warships from Colbert to Today]. Vol. 1: 1671-1870. Roche. ISBN 978-2-9525917-0-6. OCLC 165892922.
- Winfield, Rif and Roberts, Stephen S. (2015) French Warships in the Age of Sail 1786-1861: Design, Construction, Careers and Fates. Seaforth Publishing. ISBN 978-1-84832-204-2
