= French ship Impérial (1856) =

Ship of the line of the French Navy

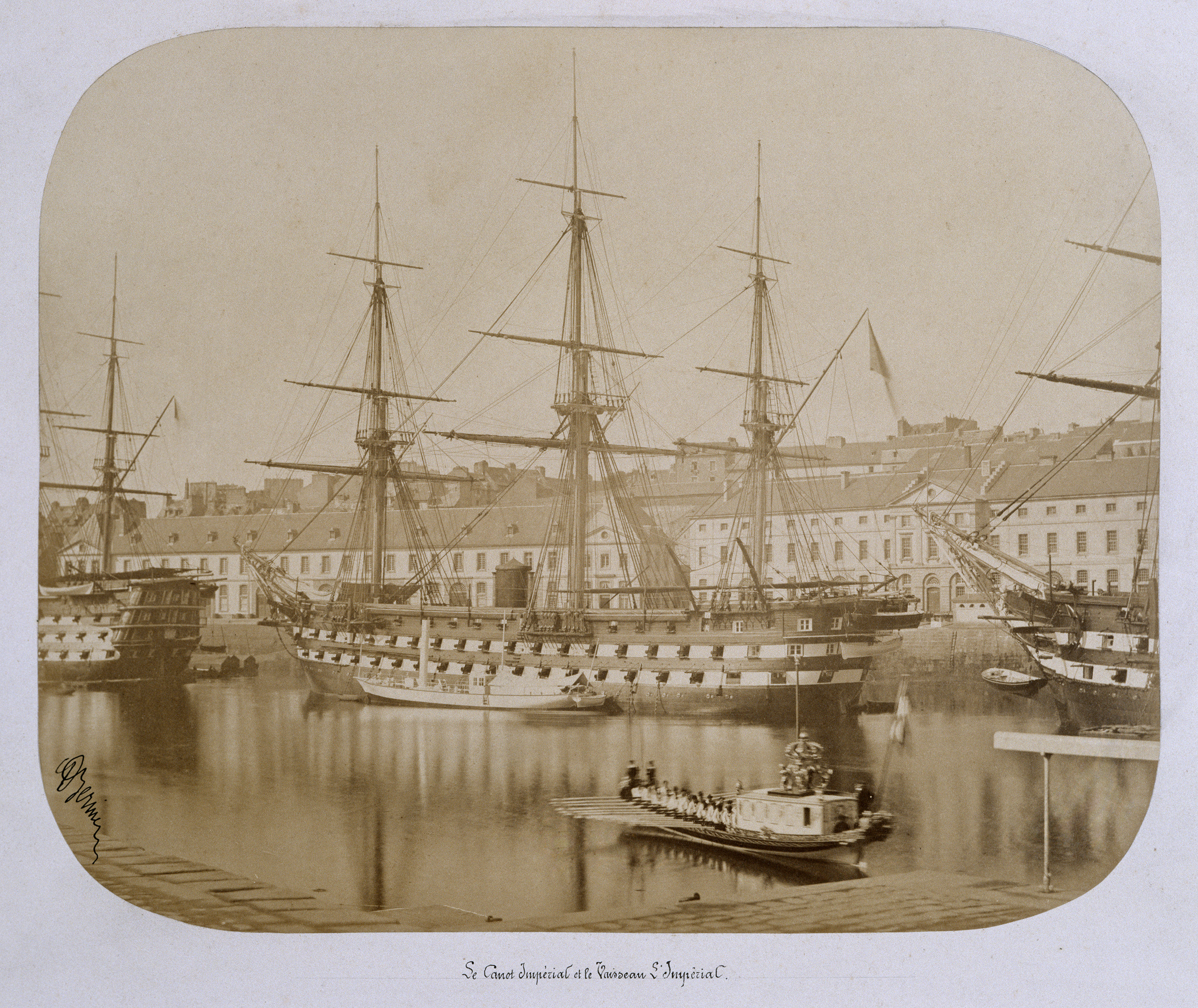
- The Emperor's barge in front of Impérial in Brest, August 1858, by Alfred Bernier

History

Second French Empire
- Name: Impérial
- Ordered: 12 July 1853
- Builder: Arsenal de Brest
- Laid down: 19 August 1853
- Launched: 15 September 1856
- Completed: February 1858
- Commissioned: 20 February 1858
- Renamed: Jupiter, 19 September 1870
- Reclassified: As a barracks ship, 1869
- Stricken: 15 November 1869
- Fate: Scrapped, 1897

General characteristics (as built)
- Class & type: Algésiras-class
- Displacement: 5,121 t (5,040 long tons)
- Length: 71.23 m (233 ft 8 in) (waterline)
- Beam: 16.8 m (55 ft 1 in)
- Draught: 8.45 m (27 ft 9 in) (full load)
- Depth of hold: 8.16 m (26 ft 9 in)
- Installed power: 8 boilers; 3,603 PS (2,650 kW)
- Propulsion: 1 screw; 2 horizontal-return connecting-rod steam engines
- Sail plan: Ship rigged
- Speed: 13 knots (24 km/h; 15 mph)
- Complement: 913
- Armament: Lower gundeck: 18 × 36 pdr cannon; 16 × 223.3 mm (8.8 in) Paixhans guns; Upper gundeck: 34 × 30 pdr cannon; Quarterdeck and forecastle: 20 × 163 mm (6.4 in) Paixhans guns; 2 × 163 mm rifled muzzle-loading guns

Impérial was one of five second-rank, 90-gun, steam-powered Algésiras-class ships of the line built for the French Navy in the 1850s. The ship participated in the Second Italian War of Independence in 1859 and the Second French intervention in Mexico in 1862. She was scrapped in 1897.

== Description ==
The Algésiras-class ships were repeats of the pioneering ship of the line Napoléon and were also designed by naval architect Henri Dupuy de Lôme. They had a length at the waterline of 71.23 metres (233 ft 8 in), a beam of 16.8 metres (55 ft 1 in) and a depth of hold of 8.16 metres (26 ft 9 in). The ships displaced 5,121 tonnes (5,040 long tons) and had a draught of 8.45 metres (27 ft 9 in) at deep load. Their crew numbered 913 officers and ratings.

The primary difference between Napoléon and the Algésiras class was that the boilers of the latter ships were moved forward of the engines. They were powered by a pair of four-cylinder horizontal-return connecting-rod steam engines that drove the single propeller shaft using steam provided by eight boilers. The engines were rated at 900 nominal horsepower and produced 3,603 metric horsepower (2,650 kW) for a speed of 13 knots (24 km/h; 15 mph). The ships were fitted with three masts and ship rigged.

The armament of the Algésiras-class ships consisted of eighteen 36-pounder (174.8 mm (6.9 in)) smoothbore cannon and sixteen 223.3 mm (8.8 in) Paixhans guns on the lower gundeck and thirty-four 30-pounder 164.7 mm (6.5 in) cannon on the upper gundeck. On the quarterdeck and forecastle were twenty 163 mm (6.4 in) Paixhans guns and a pair of 163 mm rifled muzzle-loading guns.

== Career ==
Impérial took part in the Second Italian War of Independence and the Second French intervention in Mexico. She was renamed Jupiter in 1870, used as a barracks ship, and eventually broken up in 1897.

=== References ===
- Roche, Jean-Michel (2005). Dictionnaire des bâtiments de la flotte de guerre française de Colbert à nos jours. Vol. Tome I: 1671–1870. ISBN 978-2-9525917-0-6. OCLC 165892922.
- Winfield, Rif & Roberts, Stephen S. (2015). French Warships in the Age of Sail 1786–1861: Design, Construction, Careers and Fates. Barnsley, UK: Seaforth Publishing. ISBN 978-1-84832-204-2.
