= French ship Arcole (1855) =

Ship of the line of the French Navy

History

Second French Empire
- Name: Arcole
- Namesake: Battle of Arcole
- Ordered: 13 November 1852
- Builder: Arsenal de Cherbourg
- Laid down: 4 March 1853
- Launched: 20 March 1855
- Completed: September 1856
- Commissioned: 8 May 1856
- Reclassified: As a prison hulk, May 1871
- Stricken: 11 April 1870
- Fate: Scrapped, 1872

General characteristics (as built)
- Class & type: Algésiras-class ship of the line
- Displacement: 5,121 t (5,040 long tons)
- Length: 71.23 m (233 ft 8 in) (waterline)
- Beam: 16.8 m (55 ft 1 in)
- Draught: 8.45 m (27 ft 9 in) (full load)
- Depth of hold: 8.16 m (26 ft 9 in)
- Installed power: 8 boilers; 3,600 PS (2,600 kW)
- Propulsion: 1 screw; 2 horizontal-return connecting-rod steam engines
- Sail plan: Ship rigged
- Speed: 13 knots (24 km/h; 15 mph)
- Complement: 913
- Armament: Lower gundeck: 18 × 36 pdr cannon; 16 × 223.3 mm (8.8 in) Paixhans guns; Upper gundeck: 34 × 30 pdr cannon; Quarterdeck and forecastle: 20 × 30 pdr cannon; 2 × 163 mm (6.4 in) rifled muzzle-loading guns

Arcole was one of five second-rank, 90-gun, steam-powered Algésiras-class ships of the line built for the French Navy in the 1850s. The ship participated in the Second Italian War of Independence in 1859 and was scrapped in 1872.

== Description ==
The Algésiras-class ships were repeats of the pioneering ship of the line Napoléon and were also designed by naval architect Henri Dupuy de Lôme. They had a length at the waterline of 71.23 metres (233 ft 8 in), a beam of 16.8 metres (55 ft 1 in) and a depth of hold of 8.16 metres (26 ft 9 in). The ships displaced 5,121 tonnes (5,040 long tons) and had a draught of 8.45 metres (27 ft 9 in) at deep load. Their crew numbered 913 officers and ratings.

The primary difference between Napoléon and the Algésiras class was that the boilers of the latter ships were moved forward of the engines. Arcole was powered by a pair of four-cylinder horizontal-return connecting-rod steam engines that drove the single propeller shaft using steam provided by eight boilers. The engines were rated at 900 nominal horsepower and produced 3,600 metric horsepower (2,600 kW) which gave her a speed of 13 knots (24 km/h; 15 mph). The ships were fitted with three masts and ship rigged.

The armament of the Algésiras-class ships consisted of eighteen 36-pounder (174.8 mm (6.9 in)) smoothbore cannon and sixteen 223.3 mm (8.8 in) Paixhans guns on the lower gundeck and thirty-four 30-pounder 164.7 mm (6.5 in) cannon on the upper gundeck. On the quarterdeck and forecastle were twenty 30-pounder cannon and a pair of 163 mm (6.4 in) rifled muzzle-loading guns.

== Career ==
Arcole took part in the Second Italian War of Independence, and was broken up in 1872.
