= French ship Intrépide (1864) =

Ship of the line of the French Navy

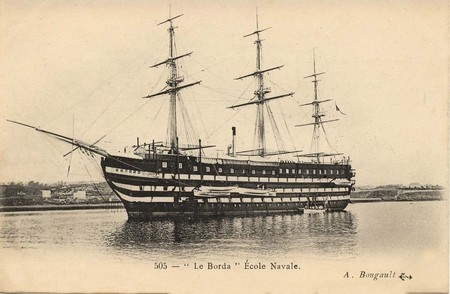
- French ship Intrépide (1864)

History

Second French Empire
- Name: Intrépide
- Ordered: 23 August 1853
- Builder: Arsenal de Rochefort
- Laid down: 2 September 1853
- Launched: 17 September 1864
- Completed: September 1865
- Commissioned: 8 May 1865
- Renamed: Borda, 1890
- Reclassified: Converted into a troopship, June 1863; As a training ship, 1883
- Stricken: 6 December 1889
- Fate: Sank by accident, May 1913

General characteristics (as completed)
- Type: Troopship
- Displacement: 5,121 t (5,040 long tons)
- Length: 71.23 m (233 ft 8 in) (waterline)
- Beam: 16.8 m (55 ft 1 in)
- Draught: 8.1 m (26 ft 7 in) (full load)
- Depth of hold: 8.16 m (26 ft 9 in)
- Installed power: 8 boilers; 2,204 ihp (1,644 kW)
- Propulsion: 1 screw; 2 trunk steam engines
- Sail plan: Ship rigged
- Speed: 12 knots (22 km/h; 14 mph)
- Armament: 4 × 30 pdr cannon

Intrépide was intended to be one of five second-rank, 90-gun, steam-powered Algésiras-class ships of the line built for the French Navy in the 1850s, but her construction was suspended for many years before she was converted into a troopship in 1863. The ship evacuated French troops in 1866–1867 after the defeat of Second French intervention in Mexico. Intrépide became a school ship in 1883 and was renamed Borda in 1890. She was withdrawn from service in 1912 and sank by accident the following year. The ship was scrapped in place from 1913 to 1922.

== Description ==
The Algésiras-class ships were repeats of the pioneering ship of the line Napoléon and were also designed by naval architect Henri Dupuy de Lôme. They had a length at the waterline of 71.23 metres (233 ft 8 in), a beam of 16.8 metres (55 ft 1 in) and a depth of hold of 8.16 metres (26 ft 9 in). The ships displaced 5,121 tonnes (5,040 long tons) and Intrépide had a draught of 8.1 metres (26 ft 7 in) at deep load.

The primary difference between Napoléon and the Algésiras class was that the boilers of the latter ships were moved forward of the engines. They were powered by a pair of trunk steam engines that drove the single propeller shaft using steam provided by eight boilers. The engines were rated at 900 nominal horsepower and produced 2,204 indicated horsepower (2,235 PS; 1,644 kW). During her sea trials, Intrépide reached a speed of 12.24 knots (22.67 km/h; 14.09 mph). The ships were fitted with three masts and ship rigged with a sail area of 2,010 square metres (21,600 sq ft). To accommodate her troops, Intrépide was only armed with four 30-pounder 164.7 mm (6.5 in) cannon.

== Career ==
Under Captain Claude Gennet, Intrépide was used as a troopship to bring the expeditionary corps of the French intervention in Mexico back to France in 1866–1867. She took part in the Siege of Sfax in 1881. From 1883, she was a school ship of the École navale, and from 1887 she was hulked as barracks. Renamed Borda in 1890, she was used again by the École navale, and was eventually broken up in 1921.
