= Russian ship of the line Imperator Nikolai I (1860) =

Imperial Russian Navy warship

History

Russian Empire
- Name: Imperator Nikolai I
- Namesake: Tsar Nicholas I of Russia
- Builder: New Admiralty Shipyard, St. Petersburg
- Laid down: 26 June 1855 (Note: All dates used in this article are Old Style)
- Launched: 18 May 1860
- In service: 1861
- Stricken: 26 January 1874

General characteristics
- Type: 111-gun steam-powered ship of the line
- Displacement: 5,426 long tons (5,513 t)
- Tons burthen: 3,469 bm
- Length: 233 ft 6 in (71.2 m) (p/p)
- Beam: 58 ft 3.5 in (17.8 m)
- Draft: 26 ft (7.9 m)
- Installed power: 600 nominal horsepower
- Propulsion: 1 shaft; 1 single-expansion steam engine
- Speed: 11 knots (20 km/h; 13 mph)
- Armament: 21 × 60-pounder smoothbore guns; 32 × long 36-pounder guns; 26 × short 36-pounder guns; 30 × 36-pounder gunnades

Imperator Nikolai I (Russian: Император Николай I) was a wooden-hulled, steam-powered, first-rate ship of the line built for the Imperial Russian Navy in the late 1850s. She served as a gunnery training ship and troopship with the Baltic Fleet for a number of years after her completion. The ship was stricken from the Navy List in 1874.

== Description, construction and career ==
The design of Imperator Nikolai I was based on that of the British first-rate ship of the line HMS Duke of Wellington. The ship was 233 feet 6 inches (71.2 m) long between perpendiculars, with a beam of 58 feet 3.5 inches (17.8 m) and a maximum draft of 26 feet (7.9 m). The ship displaced 5,426 long tons (5,513 t) and measured 3,469 tons bm. She was equipped with an imported British Humphrys and Tennant steam engine of 600 nominal horsepower that drove a single propeller shaft. Initially rated as a 124-gun ship of the line, Imperator Nikolai I was rerated while under construction as a 111-gun ship. All of her guns were smoothbores and they consisted of one 60-pounder gun on a pivot mount, twenty 60-pounder guns, 32 long and 26 short 36-pounders and thirty 36-pounder gunnades.

The ship was laid down on 26 June 1855 at the New Admiralty Shipyard in St. Petersburg with the name of Imperator Aleksandr I, but she was renamed on 28 July 1855. Imperator Nikolai I was launched on 18 July 1860 and conducted her sea trials after the installation of her engines and machinery was completed on 1 June 1861. She was considered for conversion to an ironclad in 1862–63, but no work was actually done. Imperator Nikolai I served as a gunnery training ship from 1862 to 1866 with the Baltic Fleet; she also served as a troop transport in 1863–64. The ship was stricken on 26 January 1874.
