= Algésiras-class ship of the line =

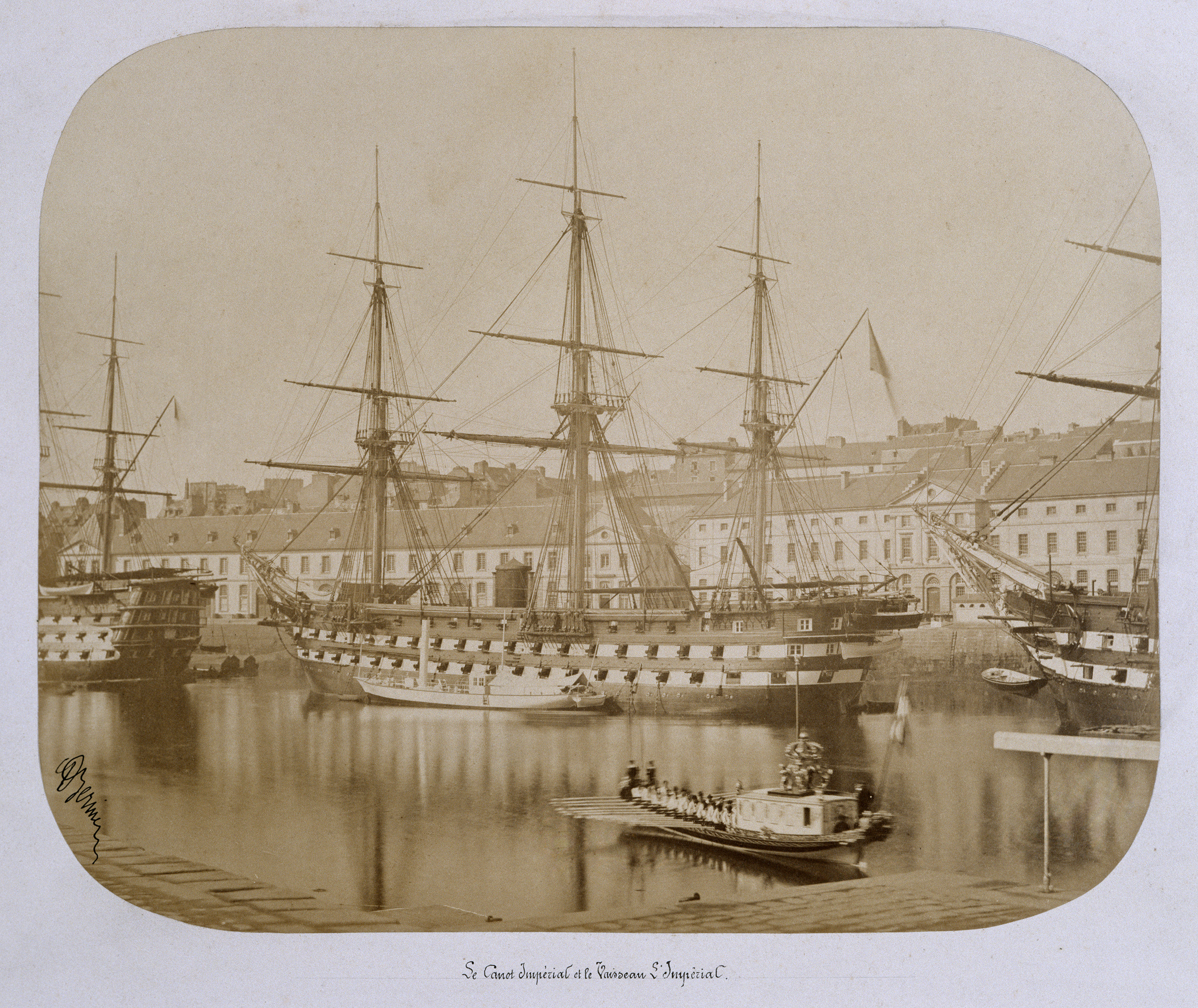
- The Emperor's barge in front of Impérial in Brest, August 1858, by Alfred Bernier

Class overview
- Name: Algésiras
- Operators: French Navy
- Preceded by: Hercule class; Napoléon
- Succeeded by: Ville de Nantes class
- Built: 1853–1865
- In service: 1856–1912
- In commission: 1856–1889
- Completed: 5

General characteristics (Algésiras as built)
- Type: 90-gun ship of the line
- Displacement: 5,121 t (5,040 long tons)
- Length: 71.23 m (233 ft 8 in) (waterline)
- Beam: 16.8 m (55 ft 1 in)
- Draught: 8.45 m (27 ft 9 in) (full load)
- Depth of hold: 8.16 m (26 ft 9 in)
- Installed power: 8 boilers; 2,057–2,204 ihp (1,534–1,644 kW)
- Propulsion: 1 screw; 2 steam engines
- Sail plan: Ship rigged
- Speed: 12 knots (22 km/h; 14 mph)
- Complement: 913
- Armament: Lower gundeck: 18 × 36 pdr cannon; 16 × 223.3 mm (8.8 in) Paixhans guns; Upper gundeck: 34 × 30 pdr cannon; Quarterdeck and forecastle: 20 × 163 mm (6.4 in) Paixhans guns; 2 × 163 mm rifled muzzle-loading guns

The Algésiras class consisted of five second-rank, 90-gun, steam-powered ships of the line built for the French Navy in the 1850s. Most of the ships participated in the Second Italian War of Independence in 1859 or the Second French intervention in Mexico in the 1860s. Beginning in the mid-1860s, they were decommissioned or converted into troopships before being scrapped beginning in the early 1870s.

== Description ==
The Algésiras-class ships were repeats of the pioneering ship of the line Napoléon and were also designed by naval architect Henri Dupuy de Lôme. They had a length at the waterline of 71.23 metres (233 ft 8 in), a beam of 16.8 metres (55 ft 1 in) and a depth of hold of 8.16 metres (26 ft 9 in). The ships displaced 5,121 tonnes (5,040 long tons) and had a draught of 8.45 metres (27 ft 9 in) at deep load. Their crew numbered 913 officers and ratings.

The primary difference between Napoléon and the Algésiras class was that the boilers of the latter ships were moved forward of the engines. They were powered by a pair of either horizontal-return connecting-rod or trunk steam engine that drove the single propeller shaft using steam provided by eight boilers. The engines were rated at 900 nominal horsepower and produced around 2,057–2,204 indicated horsepower (2,086–2,235 PS; 1,534–1,644 kW). During their sea trials, they reached speeds of 12.2–13 knots (22.6–24.1 km/h; 14.0–15.0 mph). The ships could carry 570 tonnes (561 long tons) of coal. They were fitted with three masts and ship rigged with a sail area of 2,010 square metres (21,600 sq ft).

The armament of the Algésiras-class ships generally consisted of eighteen 36-pounder (174.8 mm (6.9 in)) smoothbore cannon and sixteen 223.3 mm (8.8 in) Paixhans guns on the lower gundeck and thirty-four 30-pounder 164.7 mm (6.5 in) cannon on the upper gundeck. On the quarterdeck and forecastle were twenty 163 mm (6.4 in) Paixhans guns and a pair of 163 mm rifled muzzle-loading guns. Intrépide, converted into a troopship while still under construction, was armed only with four 30-pounder cannon.

== Ships ==
Name	Builder	Laid down	Launched	Commissioned	Fate
Algésiras	Arsenal de Toulon	April 1853	4 October 1855	10 April 1856	Destroyed by fire, 25 November 1906
Arcole	Arsenal de Cherbourg	4 March 1853	20 March 1855	8 May 1856	Scrapped, 1872
Impérial	Arsenal de Brest	19 August 1853	15 September 1856	20 February 1858	Scrapped, 1897
Intrépide	Arsenal de Rochefort	2 September 1853	17 September 1864	8 May 1865	Sank by accident, May 1913
Redoutable	Arsenal de Rochefort	11 April 1853	25 October 1855	24 November 1856	Scrapped, 1873–1874

== Bibliography ==
- Roche, Jean-Michel (2005). Dictionnaire des bâtiments de la flotte de guerre française de Colbert à nos jours. Vol. Tome I: 1671–1870. ISBN 978-2-9525917-0-6. OCLC 165892922.
- Winfield, Rif & Roberts, Stephen S. (2015). French Warships in the Age of Sail 1786–1861: Design, Construction, Careers and Fates. Barnsley, UK: Seaforth Publishing. ISBN 978-1-84832-204-2.
