= French ship Napoléon (1850) =

French military steam ship

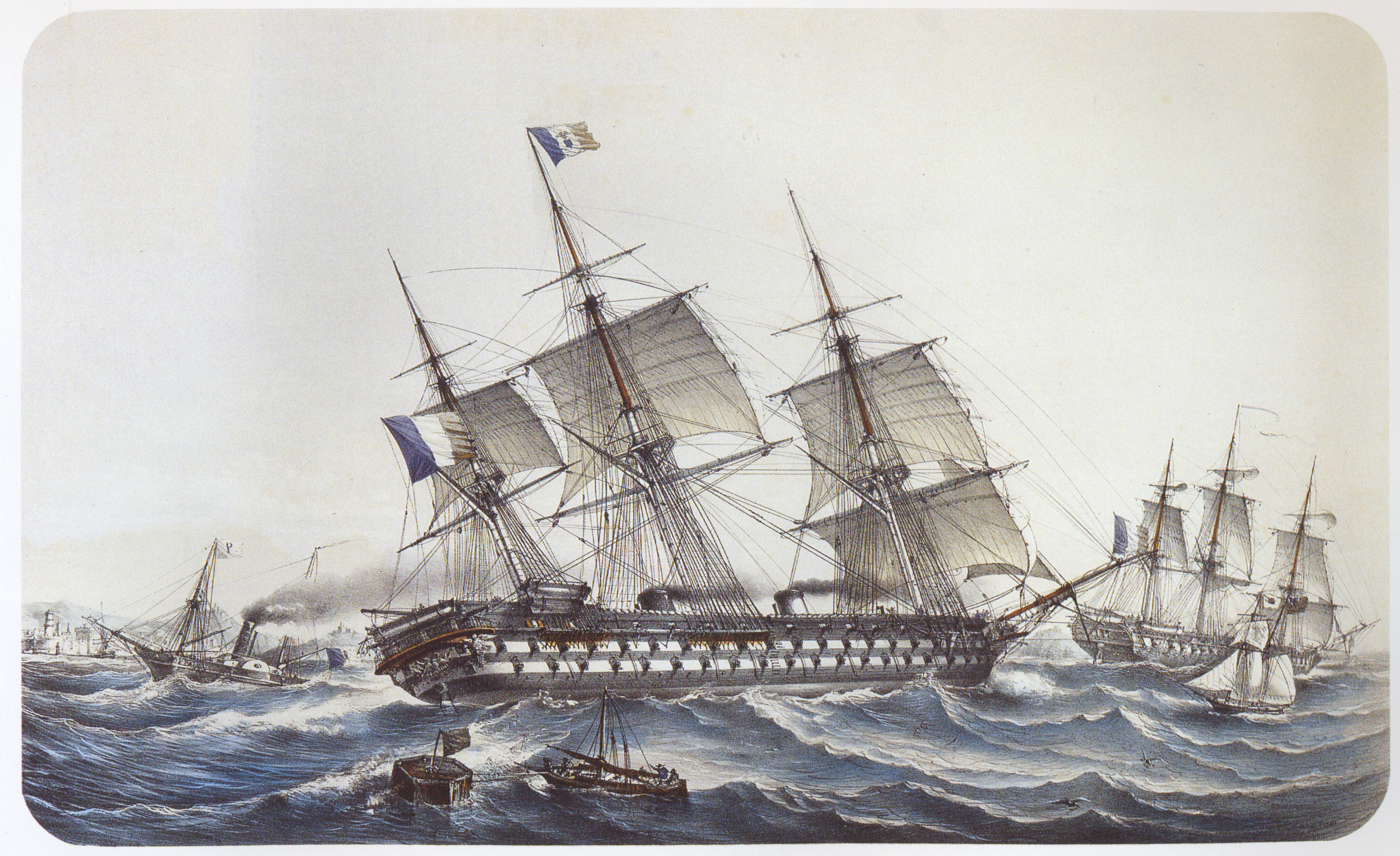
- Napoléon (1850), the first purpose-built steam battleship in history.

History

France
- Name: Napoléon
- Namesake: Napoléon I of France
- Ordered: 14 July 1847
- Builder: Toulon
- Laid down: 7 February 1848
- Launched: 16 May 1850
- Commissioned: 1 May 1852
- Stricken: 6 November 1876
- Fate: Broken up 1886

General characteristics
- Class & type: Napoléon-class ship of the line
- Displacement: 5,120 tonnes
- Length: 77.8 m (255 ft 3 in)
- Beam: 17 m (55 ft 9 in)
- Draught: 8.4 m (27 ft 7 in)
- Propulsion: Sail and 2-cyl Indret geared, 960 nhp (574 ihp)
- Speed: 12.1 knots (22.4 km/h; 13.9 mph)
- Endurance: 3 months' worth of food; 9 days' worth of coal at full-speed
- Complement: 910 men
- Armament: 90 guns; (32–30 pdr,4–22 cm); (26–30 pdr,4–22 cm); (14–16 cm)

Napoléon was a 90-gun ship of the line of the French Navy, and the first purpose-built steam battleship in the world. She is also considered the first true steam battleship, and the first ever screw battleship.

Launched in 1850, she was the lead ship of a class of nine battleships, all built over a period of ten years. This class of ship was designed by the famous naval designer Henri Dupuy de Lôme. She was originally to be named Prince de Joinville, in honour of François d'Orléans, Prince of Joinville, but was renamed 24 Février (English: 24 February) during the French Second Republic to celebrate the abdication of Louis Philippe I on that date in 1848, and later to Napoléon in May 1850, a few days after her launch. The Prince of Joinville mentioned the incident in his Vieux Souvenirs, bitterly writing "I still laugh about it". The ship was broken up in 1886.

== Technological context ==
Before the experimental adoption of the screw in warships in the 1840s, the only available steam technology was that of the paddle wheels, which, due to their positioning on the side of the hull and the large machinery they required were not compatible with the broadside cannon layout of the battleships.

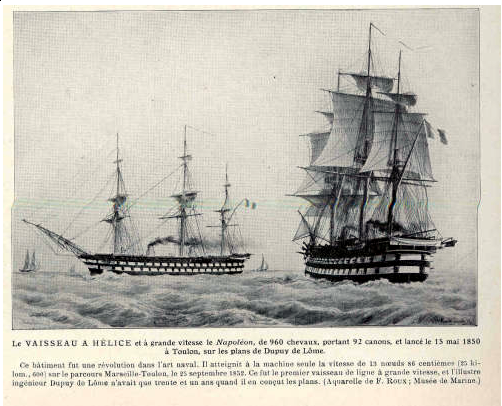
Two views of Napoléon. The rounded stern is visible.

"Dupuy de Lôme conceived and carried out the bolder scheme of designing a full-powered screw liner, and in 1847 Le Napoléon was ordered. Her success made the steam reconstruction of the fleets of the world a necessity. She was launched in 1850, tried in 1852, and attained a speed of nearly 14 knots (26 km/h). During the Crimean War her performances attracted great attention, and the type she represented was largely increased in numbers. She was about 240 ft (73 m). in length, 55 ft (17 m). in breadth, and of 5,000 tons displacement, with two gun decks. In her design boldness and prudence were well combined. The good qualities of the sailing line-of-battle ships which had been secured by the genius of Sané and his colleagues were maintained; while the new conditions involved in the introduction of steam power and large coal supply were thoroughly fulfilled."

== Developments by other navies ==
From 1844–45 the Anglo-French Entente collapsed following the French interventions in Tahiti and Morocco, and the publication of French pamphlets advocating a stronger navy (such as "Notes sur l’état des forces navales" by the Prince de Joinville), leading to an arms race in the naval area.

The United Kingdom already had a few coastal units with screw/steam propulsion in the 1840s, called "blockships", which were conversions of small traditional battleships into floating batteries with a jury rig, with a medium 450 hp (340 kW) engine for speeds of 5.8 knots (10.7 km/h; 6.7 mph) to 8.9 knots (16.5 km/h; 10.2 mph). The Royal Navy had also commissioned a number of steam sloops, HMS Rattler being the first screw-propelled warship to be launched anywhere in the world in 1843. Both nations had also developed steam frigates, the French Pomone launched in 1845, and the British Amphion a year later. However, Napoléon was the first regular steam battleship to be launched.

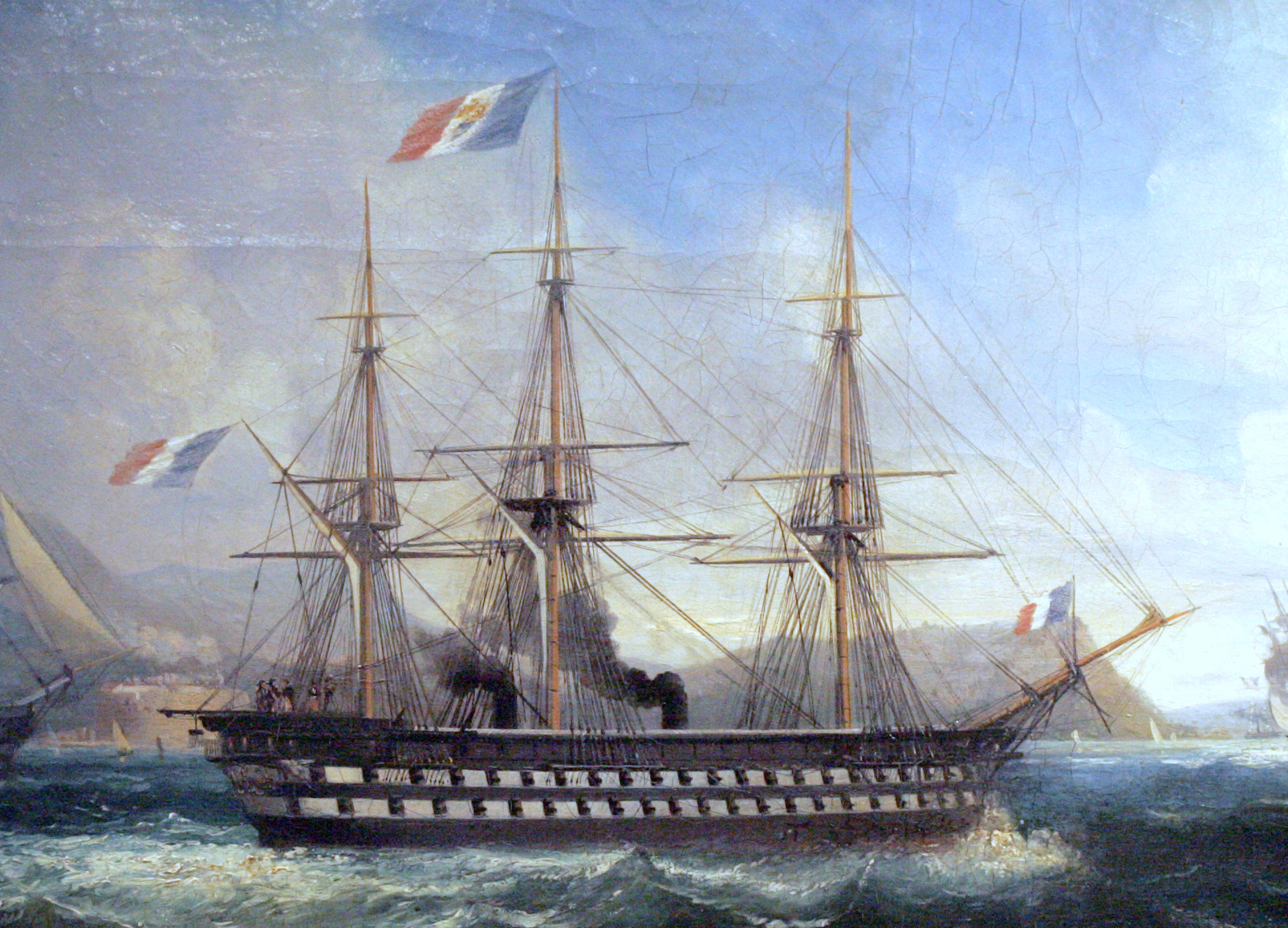
Napoléon at Toulon in 1852.

In 1847, Britain had designed a screw/steam battleship named James Watt, but the project much delayed and she did not enter service until 1854. Her sister ship, Agamemnon, was ordered in 1849 and commissioned in January 1853. Another sailing battleship, Sans Pareil, was converted to steam on the stocks and launched in March 1851; she beat Agamemnon into service in November 1852. Britain’s reluctance to commit to the steam battleship apparently stemmed from her commitment to long-distance, worldwide operation, for which, at that time, sail was still the most reliable mode of propulsion.

In the end, France and Great Britain were the only two countries to develop fleets of wooden steam battleships, although several other navies are known to have had at least one unit, built or converted with British technical support (Russia, Turkey, Sweden, Naples, Denmark and Austria). Altogether, France built 10 new wooden steam battleships and converted 28 from older battleship units, while Britain built 18 and converted 41.

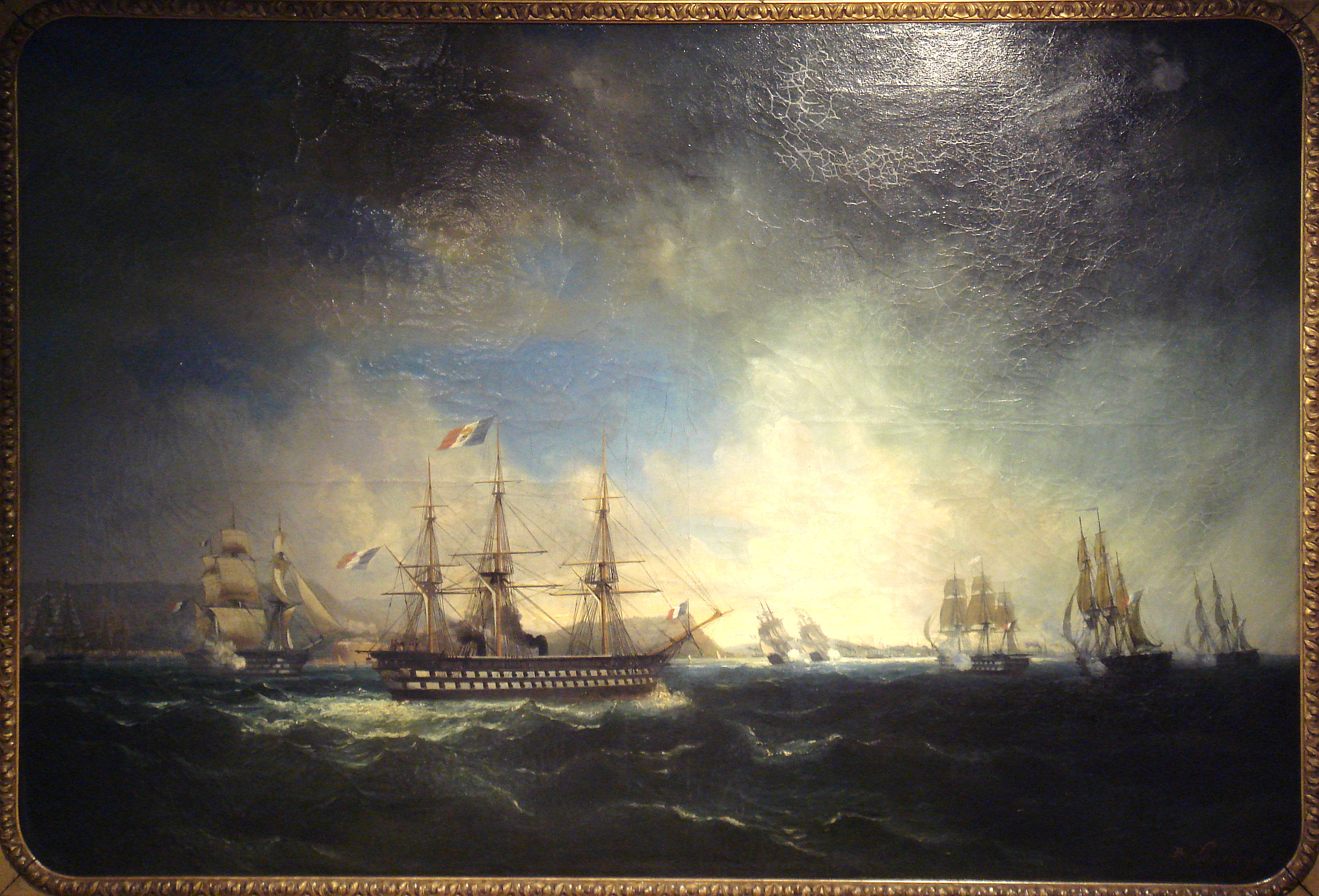
Napoléon at the 1852 naval review in Toulon.

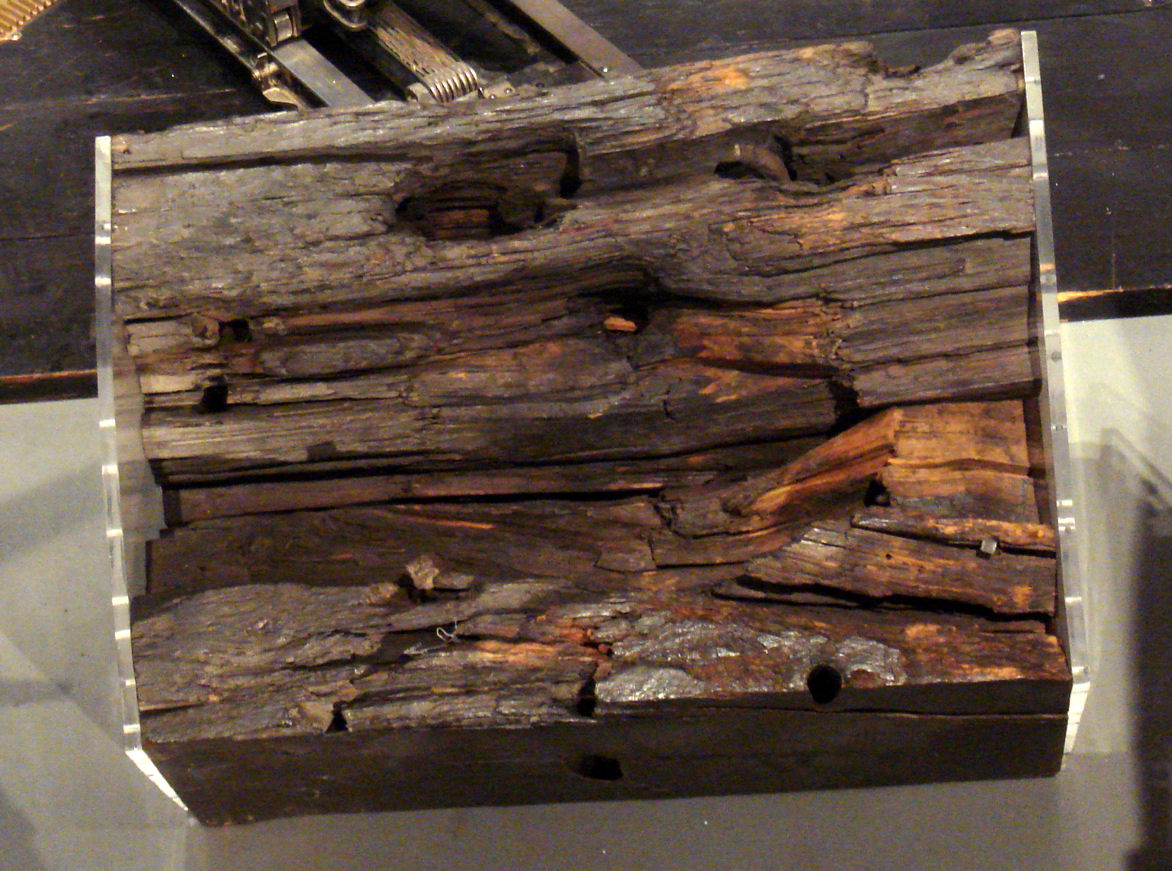
Wooden planking of the warship Napoléon, hit by cannon during the Crimean war.

== Bibliography ==
- Jones, Colin (1996). "Entente Cordiale, 1865". In McLean, David & Preston, Antony (eds.). Warship 1996. London: Conway Maritime Press. ISBN 0-85177-685-X.
- Roche, Jean-Michel (2005). Dictionnaire des bâtiments de la flotte de guerre française de Colbert à nos jours. Vol. Tome I: 1671–1870. Roche. ISBN 978-2-9525917-0-6. OCLC 165892922.
- Winfield, Rif & Roberts, Stephen S. (2015). French Warships in the Age of Sail 1786–1861: Design, Construction, Careers and Fates. Barnsley, UK: Seaforth Publishing. ISBN 978-1-84832-204-2.
- Steam, Steel and Shellfire: The Steam Warship 1815–1905, Conway’s History of the Ship, ISBN 0-7858-1413-2
