= Paixhans gun =

Paixhans gun (Canon Paixhans)
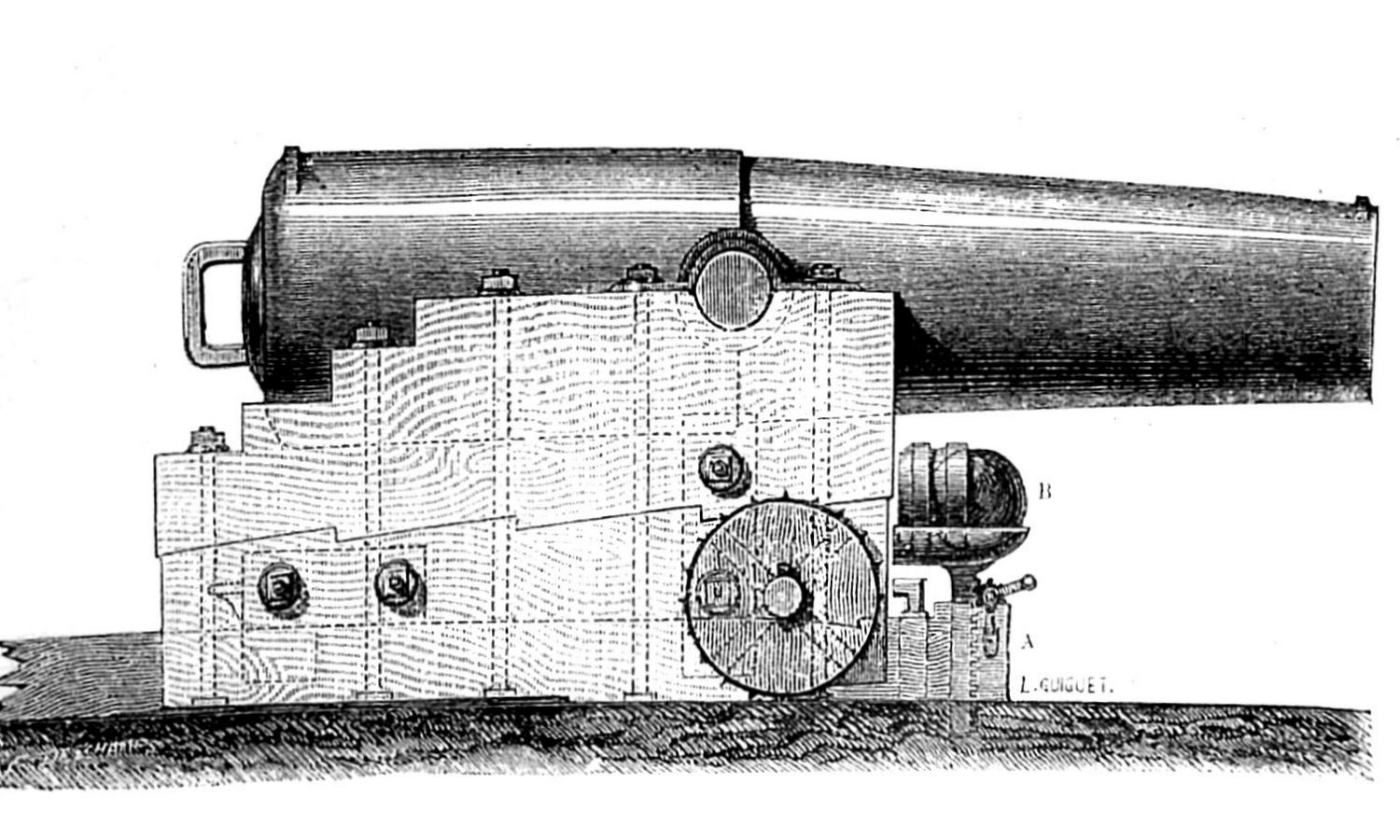
- Paixhans naval shell gun. Musée de la Marine.
- Type: Naval artillery
- Place of origin: France

Service history
- Used by: France, the United States, Russia, Ottoman Empire
- Wars: Second Opium War, Anglo-French blockade of the Río de la Plata, Mexican–American War, Second Schleswig War, Crimean War, American Civil War

Production history
- Designer: Henri-Joseph Paixhans
- Designed: 1823

Specifications
- Mass: 3,400 kg (7,500 lb)
- Length: 2.85 m (9.4 ft)
- Shell: 30 kg (66 lb) shell
- Caliber: 220 mm (8.7 in)
- Muzzle velocity: 400 m/s (1,300 ft/s)

The Paixhans gun (French: Canon Paixhans, French pronunciation: [pɛksɑ̃]) was the first naval gun designed to fire explosive shells. It was developed by the French general Henri-Joseph Paixhans in 1822–1823. The design furthered the evolution of naval artillery into the modern age. Its use presaged the end of wood as the preferred material in naval warships, and the rise of the ironclad.

Explosive shells had been used in ground warfare and against stationary targets, but not in high-velocity, flat-trajectory guns due to safety concerns. Henri-Joseph Paixhans developed a delaying mechanism that allowed explosive shells to be safely fired in high-powered guns, first demonstrated in trials in 1824. The French Navy adopted the first Paixhans guns in 1841, and the weapons eventually saw use in the 1840s by France, Britain, Russia, and the United States. The guns' effectiveness in naval combat was demonstrated in battles such as Veracruz in 1838, Campeche in 1843, and Sinop in 1853.

Although the idea was innovative, metallurgy at the time had not advanced enough for safe operation, leading to catastrophic failures in naval guns. Further developments by John A. Dahlgren and Thomas Jackson Rodman improved the weapon for both solid shot and shell use.

== Background ==
Explosive shells had long been in use in ground warfare (in howitzers and mortars) and on bomb vessels against stationary targets, but they were fired only at high angles and with relatively low velocities. The shells of that time were inherently dangerous to handle, and no method had been found to safely fire the explosive shells with the high power and flatter trajectory of a high-velocity gun.

However, before the advent of radar and modern optical controlled firing, high trajectories were not practical for ship-to-ship combat. Such combat essentially required flat-trajectory guns in order to have a reasonable chance of hitting the target. Therefore, ship-to-ship combat had consisted for centuries of encounters between flat-trajectory cannons using inert cannonballs, which could inflict only local damage, even on wooden hulls.

== Mechanism ==
Paixhans advocated using flat-trajectory shell guns against warships in 1822 in his Nouvelle force maritime et artillerie.

Paixhans developed a delaying mechanism that, for the first time, allowed shells to be fired safely in high-powered flat-trajectory guns. The effect of explosive shells lodging into wooden hulls and then detonating was potentially devastating. Henri-Joseph Paixhans first demonstrated this in trials against the two-decker Pacificateur in 1824, in which he successfully broke up the ship. Two prototype Paixhans guns had been cast in 1823 and 1824 for this test. Paixhans reported the results in Experiences faites sur une arme nouvelle. The shells had a fuze that ignited automatically when the gun was fired; they lodged in the wooden hull of the target, and exploded a moment later:

The shells which produced those very extensive ravages upon the Pacificator hulk in the experiments made at Brest, in 1821 and 1824, upon the evidences of which the French naval shell system was founded, were loaded shells, having fuzes attached, which, ignited by the explosion of the discharge in the gun, continued to burn for a time somewhat greater than that of the estimated flight, and then exploded; thus producing the maximum effect which any shell is capable of producing on a ship.

— Sir Howard Douglas, A Treatise on Naval Gunnery

The first Paixhans guns for the French Navy were made in 1841. The barrel of the guns weighed about 10,000 lb (4,500 kg), and proved accurate to about 2 mi (3.2 km). In the 1840s, France, Britain, Russia, and the United States adopted the new naval guns.

The effect of the guns in an operational context was first demonstrated during the actions at Veracruz in 1838, at Campeche in 1843, Eckernförde in 1849 during the Danish–Prussian War, and especially at the Battle of Sinop in 1853 during the Crimean War. The Naval Battle of Campeche made history because it was the first time both sides used explosive shells and the only time sailing ships defeated steamers.

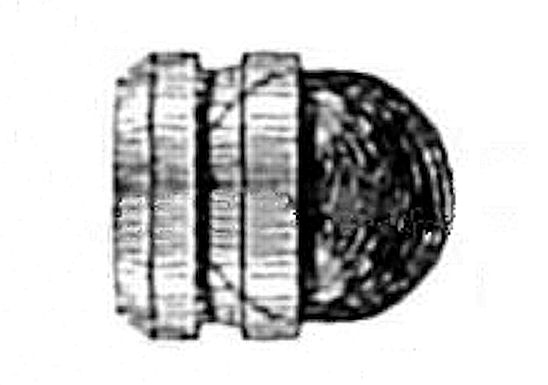
Paixhans shell with sabot

According to the Penny Cyclopædia (1858):

General Paixhans made important improvements in the construction of heavy ordnance, and also in the projectiles, in the carriages, and in the mode of working the guns. The Paixhans-guns are especially adapted for the projection of shells and hollow shot, and were first adopted in France about the year 1824. Similar pieces of ordnance have since been introduced into the British service. They are suitable either for ships of war, or for fortresses which defend coasts. The original Paixhans-gun was 9'4" long [2.84 m], and weighed nearly 74 cwts [3,800 kg]. The bore was 22 cm (8.7 in). By judicious distribution of the metal it was so much strengthened about the chamber, or place of charge, that it could bear firing with solid shot weighing from 86 to 88 lbs [39–40 kg], or with hollow shot weighing about 60 lbs [27 kg]. The charge varied from 10 lbs. 12 oz to 18 lbs [4.9–8.2 kg] of powder. General Paixhans was one of the first to recommend cylindro-conical projectiles, as having the advantage of encountering less resistance from the air than round balls, having a more direct flight, and striking the object aimed at with much greater force, when discharged from a piece of equal calibre, whether musket or great gun. As large ships of war, particularly three-decked ships, offer a mark which can hardly be missed, even at considerable distances, and as their wooden walls are so thick and strong that a shell projected horizontally could not pass through them, an explosion taking place would produce the destructive effects of springing a mine, and far exceeding those of a shell projected vertically, and acting by concussion or percussion.

— Penny Cyclopædia

== Development ==
While the idea was notable in the advance of artillery, metallurgy had not advanced to the level needed for safe operation. The naval guns of this type were known for catastrophic failures: the chambers would burst in use. The long shells and large blackpowder charges needed to propel the shells put a stress on cast-iron cannon that often could not be contained. Further work by John A. Dahlgren, and Thomas Jackson Rodman improved the weapon to use both solid shot and shell safely.

== Adoption ==
=== France ===
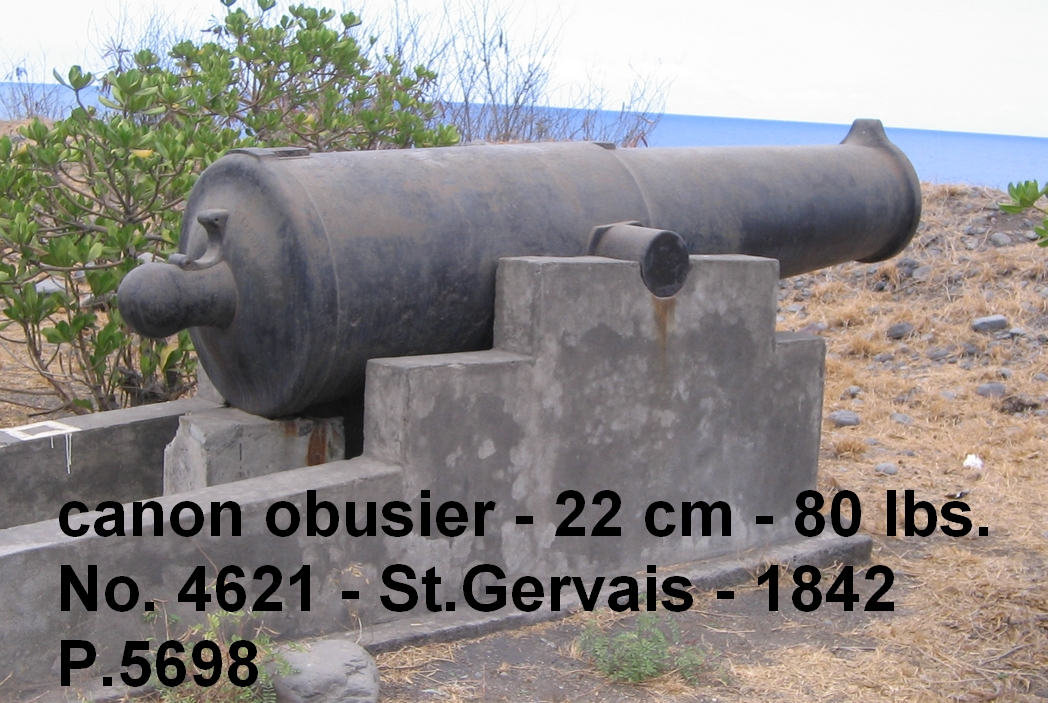
Paixhans 80lbs (22cm)

In 1827, the French navy ordered fifty large guns on the Paixhans model from the Ruelle Foundry and at Indret near Nantes. The gun chosen, the canon-obusier de 80, was so called because it was of the 22 cm (8.7 in) bore diameter which would have fired an 80-pound solid shot. The gun barrel weighed 3,600 kg (7,900 lb) and the bore was of 23 cm (9.1 in) diameter and 2.8 m (9 ft 2 in) long, firing a shell weighing 23.12 kg (51.0 lb). The guns were produced slowly and were tested afloat through the 1830s.

They formed a small part of the armament on larger ships, with only two or four guns being carried, although on smaller, experimental steam vessels they, and the much larger canon-obusier de 150 of 27 cm (11 in) bore, were proportionately more important. The paddle steamer Météore, for example, carried three canon-obusier de 80 pieces and six small carronades in 1833. Alongside the large guns which Paixhans had called for, the French navy also used a smaller shell gun, of the same 164 mm (6.5 in) bore as its standard solid shot-firing 30 pounder guns and carronades, in larger numbers with first rate ships carrying over 30 of these guns.

=== United States ===
The United States Navy adopted the design, and equipped several ships with 8-inch guns of 63 and 55 cwt. in 1845, and later a 10-inch shell gun of 86 cwt. Paixhans guns were used on USS Constitution (four Paixhans guns) in 1842, under the command of Foxhall A. Parker, Sr., USS Constellation in 1854, and were also installed on the USS Mississippi (10 Paixhans guns), and USS Susquehanna (six Paixhans guns) during Commodore Perry's mission to open Japan in 1853.

The Dahlgren gun was developed by John A. Dahlgren in 1846, with advantages over Paixhans guns:

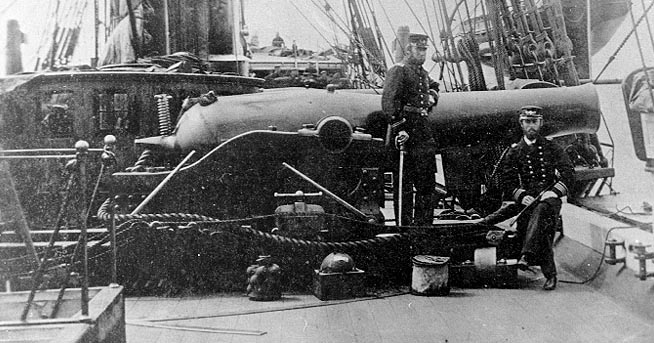
The Dahlgren gun was developed as an improvement of the Paixhans gun. View on deck of USS Kearsarge showing aft 11-inch Dahlgren shell gun.

Paixhans had so far satisfied naval men of the power of shell guns as to obtain their admission on shipboard; but by unduly developing the explosive element, he had sacrificed accuracy and range.... The difference between the system of Paixhans and my own was simply that Paixhans guns were strictly shell guns, and were not designed for shot, nor for great penetration or accuracy at long ranges. They were, therefore, auxiliary to, or associates of, the shot-guns. This made a mixed armament, was objectionable as such, and never was adopted to any extent in France... My idea was, to have a gun that should generally throw shells far and accurately, with the capacity to fire solid shot when needed. Also to compose the whole battery entirely of such guns.

— Admiral John A. Dahlgren.

=== Russia ===
The Russian Navy was the first to use the guns extensively in combat. At the Battle of Sinop in 1853, Russian ships attacked and annihilated a Turkish fleet with their Paixhans explosive shell guns. The shells penetrated deep inside the wooden planking of Turkish ships, exploding and igniting the hulls. The defeat was instrumental in convincing the naval powers of the shell's efficacy, and hastened the development of the ironclad to counter it.
