= List of ship launches in 1854 =

The list of ship launches in 1854 includes a chronological list of some ships launched in 1854.

| Date | Ship | Class | Builder | Location | Country | Notes- |
|---|---|---|---|---|---|---|
| 2 January | Recorder | Merchantman | | Carleton, New Brunswick | (United Kingdom of Great Britain and Ireland) Colony of New Brunswick | For private owner. |
| 3 January | Lightning | Extreme clipper | Donald McKay | East Boston, Massachusetts | United States | For Black Ball Line. |
| 5 January | Her Majesty | Full-rigged ship | Byers & Co | Sunderland | United Kingdom | For John Rogers Watkins. |
| 14 January | Dunsandle | Barque | Pickersgill & Miller | Sunderland | United Kingdom | For Dealy, Fidds & Ramsey. |
| 14 January | Maria Hay | Full-rigged ship | John Crown | Sunderland | United Kingdom | For John Hay. |
| 14 January | Orizaba | Paddle steamer | Jacob A. Westervelt & Co. | New York | United States | For Harris & Morgan Line. |
| 16 January | Norma | Brig | Henry Barrick | Whitby | United Kingdom | For Messrs. Weighill & Co. |
| 16 January | Sicilia | Steamship | | Glasgow | United Kingdom | For Messrs. Samuel Howes & Co. |
| 19 January | Petrel | Steamship | Messrs. C. & W. Earle | location | United Kingdom | For Messrs. W. & C. L. Ringtree. |
| 21 January | Nabob | Clipper | John Taylor | Chelsea, Massachusetts | United States | For William Appleton & Co. |
| 26 January | Advance | Steamship | G. M. Duck | South Stockton | United Kingdom | For private owner. |
| 26 January | Algiers | Second rate | | Plymouth Dockyard | United Kingdom | For Royal Navy. |
| 28 January | Bacchante | Steamship | John Laird | Liverpool | United Kingdom | For South American and General Steam Navigation Company. |
| 28 January | Bahiana | Steamship | John Laird | Birkenhead | United Kingdom | For South American and General Steam Navigation Company. |
| 28 January | Rosario | Barque | Cram | Chester | United Kingdom | For Messrs. Charles Smith & Co. |
| 30 January | Miranda | Barque | Messrs. L. Kennedy & Co. | Whitehaven | United Kingdom | For private owner. |
| 30 January | Simla | Steamship | Messrs. Tod and Macgregor | Partick | United Kingdom | For P&O. |
| 31 January | Black Eagle | Full-rigged ship | Messrs. Getty & Major | Liverpool | United Kingdom | For Messrs. Getty & Major. |
| 31 January | City of Palaces | Barque | Thomas Wallis | South Shields | United Kingdom | For Messrs. Clint & Co. and partners. |
| 31 January | Hannibal | Second rate | | Deptford Dockyard | United Kingdom | For Royal Navy. |
| 31 January | Margaret | Merchantman | James Hardie | Sunderland | United Kingdom | For Thompson & Co. |
| 31 January | Tamar | Paddle steamer | | Northfleet | United Kingdom | For Royal Mail Steam Packet Company. |
| January | Arnotdale | Full-rigged ship | John & Robert Candlish | Southwick | United Kingdom | For Messrs. Conbro & Potter. |
| January | Coeur de Lion | Medium clipper | George Raynes | Portsmouth, New Hampshire | United States | For W. F. Parrott and Mr. Tucker. |
| January | Crown | Barque | J. Crown | Sunderland | United Kingdom | For J. Crown. |
| January | Duchess of Northumberland | Barque | William Reed | Sunderland | United Kingdom | For S. Mease. |
| January | Great Britain, or New Great Britain | Full-rigged ship | J. Reed | Pallion | United Kingdom | For Mr. Temperley. |
| January | Sir William Wallace | Steamship | Messrs. Thobourn & Co. | "Coble Dean" | United Kingdom | For Messrs. Joseph Blacklock & Co. |
| January | The Guide | Merchantman | Kelly | Dartmouth | United Kingdom | For private owner. |
| January | Tijaret Misr | Brig | John Smith | Sunderland | United Kingdom | For Mr. Grey, or Joyce & Co. |
| January | Unnamed | East Indiaman | Robert Thompson & Sons | Monkwearmouth | United Kingdom | For Edmund Graham. |
| 8 February | Glen Roy | Merchantman | Messrs. Denny & Rankin | Dumbarton | United Kingdom | For Messrs. Peter & Thomson Aikman. |
| 11 February | Crouch Brothers | Barque | Messrs. Symons & Bevan | Wapping | United Kingdom | For Messrs. E. Crouch & Co. |
| 11 February | Starlight | Full-rigged ship | E. & H. O. Briggs | South Boston, Massachusetts | United States | For Baker & Morill. |
| 14 February | Raphael | Clipper | Messrs. Alexander Duthie & Co. | Aberdeen | United Kingdom | For Andrew Anderson. |
| 15 February | Donawerth | Suffren-class ship of the line | Pierre Thomeuf | Lorient | France | For French Navy. |
| 15 February | Mountstuart Elphinstone | Steamship | | Bombay | India | For private owner. |
| 18 February | Ogmore | Steamship | Messrs. Batchelor | Cardiff | United Kingdom | For private owner. |
| 28 February | Driving Mist | Snow | W. Pile | Sunderland | United Kingdom | For William Maudsley. |
| 28 February | Isa | Barque | Messrs. William Simons & Co. | Whiteinch | United Kingdom | For Messrs. Gregor, Turnbull & Co. |
| 28 February | Louis-XIV | Océan-class ship of the line | | Rochefort | France | For French Navy. |
| 28 February | Nubia | Steamship | John Laird, Sons & Co. | Birkenhead | United Kingdom | For P&O |
| 28 February | Santa Cruz | Paddle steamer | Messrs. Thompson | Deptford | United Kingdom | For private owner. |
| February | Achilles | Full-rigged ship | J. Watson | Sunderland | United Kingdom | For Shield & Co. |
| February | Alice & Ann | Barque | Rawson & Watson | Southwick | United Kingdom | For Mr. Barras. |
| February | Andrew Marvell | Barque | Haswell | Sunderland | United Kingdom | For private owner. |
| February | Caroline Elizabeth | Barque | Briggs | Sunderland | United Kingdom | For T. Todd. |
| February | Hekin | Snow | Thomas Robson | Sunderland | United Kingdom | For Herring & Co. |
| February | Meteor | Barque | Sykes & Co | Sunderland | United Kingdom | For John Lambton, Robert Lambton, John Scurfield and Robert Scurfield. |
| February | Phoenix | Clipper | | Cape Elizabeth, Maine | United States | For private owner. |
| February | Pomona | Steamship | | Liverpool | United Kingdom | For South American and General Steam Navigation Company. |
| February | Sultana | Full-rigged ship | Arrow Leithead | Sunderland | United Kingdom | For John Hay. |
| February | Usworth | Barque | Todd & Brown | Sunderland | United Kingdom | For M. Tweddell. |
| 1 March | Caroline Chisholm | Steamship | Messrs. Coutts & Parkinson | Howdon | United Kingdom | For W. S. Lindsay. |
| 1 March | City of Bristol | Full-rigged ship | Lawson Gales | Hylton | United Kingdom | For Evans, Son & Avery. |
| 7 March | Plymouth | Steamship | Stephenson & Lafrinier | Ohio City, Ohio | United States | For Sternberg & Co. |
| 11 MArch | The Volunteer | Steamship | Messrs. Palmer Bros. | Jarrow | United Kingdom | For Messrs. Laing & Stephens. |
| 13 March | Empress Eugenie | Full-rigged ship | William Briggs | Sunderland | United Kingdom | For W. Briggs. |
| 15 March | Assaye | Paddle frigate | | Bombay | India | For Indian Navy. |
| 15 March | Merrington | Clipper | Cunningham | St. Lawrence | United Kingdom | For Messrs. G. W. Beckwith & Co. |
| 15 March | Virginia | Cutter yacht | Daniel Robinson | Gosport | United Kingdom | For Joseph Gee. |
| 16 March | Brandon | Steamship | Messrs. Barclay & Curle | Stobcross | United Kingdom | For London and Limerick Steam-ship Company. |
| 16 March | Galatea | Medium clipper | Joseph Magoun | Charlestown, Massachusetts | United States | For W. F. Weld & Co. |
| 17 March | Come On | Snow | Forrest & Co. | Sunderland | United Kingdom | For G. Foster. |
| 18 March | Clyde | Steamship | Messrs. John Scott & Sons | Greenock | United Kingdom | For private owner. |
| 18 March | Gequitrinhonha | Frigate | Green | Blackwall | United Kingdom | For Imperial Brazilian Navy. |
| 27 March | Leda | Steamship | Neptune Iron Workd | Waterford | United Kingdom | For private owner. |
| 28 March | Cameo | Barque | G. Booth | Sunderland | United Kingdom | For Johnson & Co. |
| 28 March | Emily Amina | Merchantman | Messrs. Thomas and De Winton | Caernarfon | United Kingdom | For private owner. |
| 29 March | Duguay-Trouin | Hercule-class ship of the line | Charles Robert Alexandre | Lorient | France | For French Navy. |
| 29 March | Lord Raglan | Full-rigged ship | Robert Thompson & Sons | Sunderland | United Kingdom | For Mr. Nicholson. |
| 29 March | Ocean Telegraph | Full-rigged ship | James O. Curtis | Medford, Massachusetts | United Kingdom | For Reed, Wade & Co. |
| 30 March | Tilsitt | Suffren-class ship of the line | Louis Nicholas Frédéric Sollier | Cherbourg | United Kingdom | For French Navy. |
| 20 March | Walter Dean | Schooner | Thomas Smith | Preston | United Kingdom | For private owner. |
| 29 March | Ocean Telegraph | Extreme clipper | J. O. Curtis | Medford, Massachusetts | United States | For Reed, Wade & Co. |
| March | Alice | Schooner | Johnson | Bideford | United Kingdom | For private owner. |
| March | Lizzy Garrow | Merchantman | | Kingsbridge | United Kingdom | For private owner. |
| March | Stormaway | Clipper | | | United States | For private owner. |
| 1 April | Gothenburg | Steamship | Charles Lungley & Co. | Millwall | United Kingdom | For North of Europe Steam Navigation Co. |
| 1 April | Mary Anne | Barque | John Westacott | Barnstaple | United Kingdom | For Messrs. Bruford & Co. |
| 4 April | Swallow | Clipper | Robert E. Jackson | East Boston, Massachusetts | United States | For Duggan & Leland and Seccomb & Taylor. |
| 11 April | Ecliptic | Barque | Lightfoot | Hylton Dene or Pallion | United Kingdom | For Brown & Sacker. |
| 12 April | Phoebe | Indefatigable-class frigate | | Devonport Dockyard | United Kingdom | For Royal Navy. |
| 12 April | Lady Wharncliffe | Barque | T. Stonehouse | Sunderland | United Kingdom | For Smith & Co. |
| 12 April | Prince | Steamship | C. J. Mare | Blackwall | United Kingdom | For General Screw Steam Shipping Company. |
| 13 April | Bankside | Barque | Austin & Mills | Sunderland | United Kingdom | For Messrs. Peggs & Co. |
| 13 April | Curacoa | Tribune-class frigate | | Pembroke Dockyard | United Kingdom | For Royal Navy. |
| 13 April | Enea | Barque | Bailey | Pallion | United Kingdom | For Mr. Hikie. |
| 13 April | Hornet | Cruizer-class sloop | | Deptford Dockyard | United Kingdom | For Royal Navy. |
| 13 April | Lady Ann | Full-rigged ship | John Smith | Pallion | United Kingdom | For George Hodgkinson. |
| 13 April | Ocean Queen | Merchantman | Rawson & Watson | Sunderland | United Kingdom | For Mr. Thomas. |
| 13 April | Ocean Queen | Steamship | Messrs. Charles & William Earle | Hull | United Kingdom | For Messrs. Depledge Bros. |
| 13 April | Radetzky | Frigate | Money Wigram & Sons | Northam | United Kingdom | For Austrian Navy. |
| 15 April | Anglo Saxon | Full-rigged ship | J. Watson, or Watson & Sons | Sunderland | United Kingdom | For Peter Tindale Jr. |
| 15 April | City of Montreal | Clipper | Messrs. John Reed & Co. | Port Glasgow | United Kingdom | For Messrs. Jacot, Taylor & Tipper. |
| 15 April | Deva | East Indiaman | Clarke | Liverpool | United Kingdom | For private owner. |
| 15 April | Joseph Steel | East Indiaman | J. Steel Jr. | Liverpool | United Kingdom | For private owner. |
| 15 April | Louisa Shelburne | Merchantman | | Nine Elms | United Kingdom | For private owner. |
| 15 April | Turenne | Hercule-class ship of the line | | Rochefort | France | For French Navy. |
| 17 April | Midnight | Clipper | Fernald & Pettigres | Portsmouth, New Hampshire | United States | For Henry Hastings. |
| 19 April | Champion of the Seas | Extreme clipper | Donald McKay | East Boston, Massachusetts | United States | For Black Ball Line. |
| 20 April | Madge Wildfire | Barque | Albert White | Waterford | United Kingdom | For private owner. |
| 21 April | Aracan | Full-rigged ship | Messrs. Brocklebank | Whitehaven | United Kingdom | For private owner. |
| 21 April | Punjaub | Paddle frigate | Cursetjee Rustomjee | Bombay Dockyard | India | For Indian Navy. |
| 26 April | Saint Louis | Suffren-class ship of the line | Joseph Germain Chéri Fauveau | Brest | France | For French Navy. |
| 27 April | Falcon | Steamship | Cork Steam Ship Company | Cork | United Kingdom | For private owner. |
| 27 April | James Pilkington | Full-rigged ship | John Getty | Liverpool | United Kingdom | For Edward Bates. |
| 30 April | The Jamaica | Clipper | Messrs. W. Simons & Co. | Whiteinch | United Kingdom | For Stirling, Gordon & Co. |
| April | Arrow | Schooner | Messrs. Denny & Rankin | Dumbarton | United Kingdom | For Messrs. Gibson & Clark. |
| April | Baltic | Steamship | Alexander Denny | location | United Kingdom | For Messrs. Thomas Wilson, Sons, & Co. |
| April | Donna Anna | Merchantman | Mansfield | Teignmouth | United Kingdom | For Messrs. Walker & Son. |
| April | Juno | Snow | William Reed | Sunderland | United Kingdom | For C. Alcock. |
| April | Nor'wester | Clipper | S. Lapham | Medford, Massachusetts | United States | For J. T. Coolidge & Co. |
| 4 May | Henrietta | Full-rigged ship | William Harkass | Sunderland | United Kingdom | For Charles, Edward & William Rayner. |
| 10 May | Isabella Hay | Brig | T. & J. Robinson | Hylton | United Kingdom | For Mr. Marks. |
| 13 May | Ben Avon | Clipper | Messrs. A. Duthie & Co. | Aberdeen | United Kingdom | For G. Leslie. |
| 13 May | Black Orince | Steamship | Messrs. Thomas Vernon & Sons | Liverpool | United Kingdom | For General Iron Screw Collier Company. |
| 13 May | Britannia | Brig | W. Johnson | Coxgreen | United Kingdom | For Mr. Sutherland. |
| 13 May | Burra Burra | Steamship | Messrs. Cato & Miller | Liverpool | United Kingdom | For Mr. Hall. |
| 13 May | Harrier | Cruizer-class sloop | | Pembroke Dockyard | United Kingdom | For Royal Navy. |
| 13 May | June | Merchantman | Messrs. Brundritt & Whiteway | Runcorn | United Kingdom | For private owner. |
| 13 May | Lady Octavia | Barque | Bank Quay Foundry Co. | Warrington | United Kingdom | For Messrs Charles Moore & Co. |
| 13 May | Omar Pasha | Clipper | Messrs. W. Hood & Co. | Aberdeen | United Kingdom | For Mr. Thompson. |
| 13 May | Royal Albert | Ship of the line | | Woolwich Dockyard | United Kingdom | For Royal Navy. |
| 13 May | Star Queen | Full-rigged ship | Richard Wilkinson | Pallion | United Kingdom | For J. Shepherd. |
| 13 May | Ulm | Hercule-class ship of the line | | Rochefort | France | For French Navy. |
| 15 May | Arthur Wellesley | Barque | Messrs, Morrison & Fawcus | South Shields | United Kingdom | For E. Oliver. |
| 15 May | Cossack | Cossack-class corvette | W. & H. Pitcher | Northfleet | United Kingdom | For Royal Navy. |
| 16 May | Englishman | Brig | Messrs. J. & R. White | Cowes | United Kingdom | For private owner. |
| 17 May | Tartar | Cossack-class corvette | W. & H. Pitcher | Northfleet | United Kingdom | For Royal Navy. |
| 18 May | Poltawa | Ship of the line | | Sveaborg | (Russian Empire) Grand Duchy of Finland | For Imperial Russian Navy. |
| 24 May | Tejuca | Full-rigged ship | Isaac C. Smith & Son | Hoboken, New Jersey | United States | For Napier, Johnson & Co. |
| 27 May | Bride of the Ocean | Barque | | Howdon | United Kingdom | For private owner. |
| 27 May | Candace | Steamship | John Laird | Liverpool | United Kingdom | For African Steam Navigation Company. |
| 27 May | Come On | Merchantman | Holman | Topsham | United Kingdom | For private owner. |
| 27 May | James Montgomery | Barque | George Worthy | Pallion | United Kingdom | For Jane B., Robert, Richard, Thomas & J. B. Hansell. |
| 29 May | Hirnant | Yacht | H. Richardson | Barmouth | United Kingdom | For H. J. Richardson. |
| 29 May | Sierra Nevada | Clipper | Tobey & Littlefield | Portsmouth, New Hampshire | United States | For Glidden & Williams. |
| 30 May | City of Philadelphia | Steamship | Messrs. Tod & McGregor | Partick | United Kingdom | For Inman Line. |
| 31 May | Curlew | Swallow-class sloop | | Deptford Dockyard | United Kingdom | For Royal Navy. |
| May | Eblana | Merchantman | Peter Gibson | Sunderland | United Kingdom | For T. Speeding. |
| May | Elpis | Merchantman | J. & R. Mills | Sunderland | United Kingdom | For Graydon & Co. |
| May | Fullerton | Brig | Banks | Howden Dyke | United Kingdom | For private owner. |
| May | Harvest Queen | Barque | William H. Webb | New York | United States | For C. H. Marshall & Co. |
| May | King John | Barque | Ratcliffe & Spence | Sunderland | United Kingdom | For Wilson & Co. |
| May | Pioneer | Barque | D. Douglas | Sunderland | United Kingdom | For Waite & Co. |
| May | Sierra Nevada | Full-rigged ship | Messrs. Tobie & Littlefold | Portsmouth, New Hampshire | United States | For Pearce Wentworth Penhallow and others. |
| May | Wild Wave | Barque | | Bathurst | (United Kingdom of Great Britain and Ireland) Colony of New Brunswick | For private owner. |
| 3 June | Sting Ray | Medium clipper | Eckford Webb | Greenpoint, New York | United States | For Wakeman & Dimon. |
| 6 June | L'Imperatrice Eugenie | Barque | Messrs. Scott & Co | Cartsdyke | United Kingdom | For John T. Rennie. |
| 8 June | Newcastle | Paddle steamer | Messrs. Miller, Ravenhill & Salkeld | Low Walker | United Kingdom | For Royal West Indian Mail Steam Packet Company. |
| 10 June | Eliza Jane | Snow | George Booth | Sunderland | United Kingdom | For Mr. Wrightson. |
| 12 June | Esk | Highflyer-class corvette | J. Scott Russell & Co. | Millwall | United Kingdom | For Royal Navy. |
| 12 June | Swallow | Swallow-class sloop | | Pembroke Dockyard | United Kingdom | For Royal Navy. |
| 12 June | Wagram | Hercule-class ship of the line | | Lorient | France | For French Navy. |
| 12 June | Northumberland | Barque | Bowman and Drummond | Blyth | United Kingdom | For John Dryden & Thomas Dryden. |
| 13 June | Earl of Eglington | Clipper | Portland Shipbuilding Company | Troon | United Kingdom | For Bailie Mitchell. |
| 13 June | Fire Fly | Steamship | Messrs. Thomas Vernon & Sons | Liverpool | United Kingdom | For General Iron Screw Collier Company. |
| 13 June | Ocean Queen | Fishing vessel | Samuel Mason | Runcorn | United Kingdom | For Mr. Isaacs. |
| 13 June | Ocean Queen | Fishing vessel | Mason | Garston | United Kingdom | For R. Isaac. |
| 14 June | Black Crow | Steamship | Joint Stock Company | Workington | United Kingdom | For Messrs. Potter & Co. |
| 14 June | Cherokee | Clipper | Messrs. Robert Steele & Co. | Greenock | United Kingdom | For Messrs. James & Alexander Allen. |
| 15 June | Unnamed | paddle frigate | Wigram | Blackwall | United Kingdom | For Austrian Navy. |
| 17 June | Minion | Yacht | Messrs. Ratsey & Sons | Cowes | United Kingdom | For Mr. Cox. |
| 18 June | Marion | Steamship | Messrs. William Simons & Co. | Whiteinch | United Kingdom | For Messrs. Kerr, Wilson, Kay & Co. |
| 20 June | Eliza | Schooner | Mansfield | Teignmouth | United Kingdom | For Messrs. G. P. Ward & Pike. |
| 20 June | George Woolfe | Barque | Messrs. Hodgson & Gardner | Hylton | United Kingdom | For George John Woolfe. |
| 24 June | Ellan Vannin | Paddle steamer | John Laird & Co. | Wallasey | United Kingdom | For Castletown Steam Navigation Company. |
| 26 June | Arrow | Arrow-class gunvessel | | Blackwall | United Kingdom | For Royal Navy. |
| 27 June | Commonwealth | Paddle steamer | Lawrence & Foulks | New York | United States | For Norwich & New London Steam Boat Company. |
| 27 June | Governess | Brig | Messrs. Stephen & Forbes | Peterhead | United Kingdom | For James Milne. |
| 27 June | Jura | Steamship | Messrs. J. & G. Thompson | Clydebank | United Kingdom | For Cunard Line. |
| 28 June | Asterion | Clipper | Stetson | Chelsea, Massachusetts | United States | For David Snow and others. |
| 28 June | Gundreda | Barque | J. Gray | Newhaven | United Kingdom | For Messrs. Hillman & Beard. |
| 29 June | Harriet Armitage | Barque | Messrs. Hall & Sons | Footdee | United Kingdom | For Messrs. Armitage Bros. |
| June | Ariosto | Snow | Lawson Gales | Sunderland | United Kingdom | For Thomas Cropton. |
| June | Canaan | Full-rigged ship | William Wilkinson | Deptford | United Kingdom | For J. Miller. |
| June | Chapman | Full-rigged ship | J. Watson | Pallion | United Kingdom | For Mr. Chapman. |
| June | Corsican | Barque | Forrest & Co., or Forrest & Jackson | Hylton | United Kingdom | For J. Hay. |
| June | Eupatoria | Merchantman | J. & T. Robinson | Deptford | United Kingdom | For T. & J. Marwood. |
| June | Spray of the Ocean | Full-rigged ship | William Pile | Sunderland | United Kingdom | For Bryce, Friend & Co. |
| June | Sea Serpent | Barque | | Montrose | United Kingdom | For private owner. |
| June | Sully | Steamship | | La Seyne-sur-Mer | France | For Gay et Compagnie. |
| June | Wanderer | Snow | J. Hutchinson | Sunderland | United Kingdom | For J. Ayre. |
| June | William Norris | Steamship | Griffith | Greenpoint, New York | United States | For private owner. |
| June | Wrangler | Arrow-class gunvessel | Messrs. R. & H. Green | Blackwall | United Kingdom | For Royal Navy. |
| 1 July | Eva | Fishing vessel | Good | Dublin | United Kingdom | For private owner. |
| 5 July | Edina | Steamship | Barclay & Curle | Glasgow | United Kingdom | For private owner. |
| 10 July | Daphne | Full-rigged ship | Thomas Alcock | Sunderland | United Kingdom | For John T. Alcock. |
| 10 July | Lebnon | Merchantman | J. Candlish, or Candlish Bros. | Sunderland | United Kingdom | For J. Candlish. |
| 10 July | Ocean Express | Medium clipper | J. O. Curtis | Medford, Massachusetts | United States | For Reed, Wade & Co. |
| 11 July | Allen Gardiner | Schooner | | Dartmouth | United Kingdom | For South American Mission Society. |
| 11 July | Athenian | Steamship | Messrs. Smith & Rodger | Govan | United Kingdom | For Messrs. Lewis, Potter & Co. |
| 11 July | Blue Jacket | Merchantman | Peasley | Passage West | United Kingdom | For Messrs. Scott & Co. |
| 11 July | Parisien | Merchantman | Wright | Kincardine | United Kingdom | For Henry Adamson. |
| 12 July | Ariel | Swallow-class sloop | | Pembroke Dockyard | United Kingdom | For Royal Navy. |
| 12 July | Better Luck Still | Barque | Robert Thompson & Sons | Sunderland | United Kingdom | For Edmund Graham. |
| 12 July | Exmouth | Albion-class ship of the line | | Devonport Dockyard | United Kingdom | For Royal Navy. |
| 12 July | Pera | Steamship | John Laird | Birkenhead | United Kingdom | For P&O |
| 12 July | Whirlwind | Merchantman | Messrs. Stephen & Sons | Dundee | United Kingdom | For Messrs. Somes Bros. |
| 13 July | Dowthorpe | Barque | Messrs. Earle's | Hull | United Kingdom | For Messrs. John Beadle & Co. |
| 13 July | Helena | Steamship | Cram | Chester | United Kingdom | For James Haddock. |
| 13 July | Imperador | Barque | Messrs. Getty, Jones & Co. | Liverpool | United Kingdom | For T. B. Hughes. |
| 13 July | Imperador | Steamship | John Laird | Liverpool | United Kingdom | For: South American & General Steam |
| 13 July | Perseverance | Steamship | | Blackwall | United Kingdom | For British Government. |
| 13 July | Storm Cloud | Clipper | Messrs. Alexander Stephen & Sons | Kelvinhaugh | United Kingdom | For Messrs. Cree, Skinner & Co. |
| 15 July | Inclined Plane | Schooner | Cunningham | Southampton | United Kingdom | For private owner. |
| 20 July | Beagle | Arrow-class gunvessel | C. J. Mare & Co. | Leamouth | United Kingdom | For Royal Navy. |
| 2o July | Canadian | Steamship | Messrs. Denny | Dumbarton | United Kingdom | For private owner. |
| 22 July | Lynx | Arrow-class gunvessel | Messrs. Mare & Co. | Blackwall | United Kingdom | For Royal Navy. |
| 25 July | Dream | Yacht | Camper | Gosport | United Kingdom | For Mr. Bentinck. |
| 25 July | Minx | Gunboat | Messrs. Green | Blackwall | United Kingdom | For Royal Navy. |
| 25 July | James Baines | Extreme clipper | Donald McKay | East Boston, Massachusetts | United States | For Black Ball Line |
| 25 July | Navarin | Hercule-class ship of the line | | Toulon | France | For French Navy. |
| 26 July | Orwell | East Indiaman | Vaux | Harwich | United Kingdom | For William Phillips. |
| 27 July | Ariel | Barque | Messrs. Turnbull & Craggs | Stockton-on-Tees | United Kingdom | For private owner. |
| 27 July | Osborne Howes | Medium clipper | Hayden & Cudworth | Medford, Massachusetts | United States | For Howes & Crowell. |
| 28 July | Robert Stephenson | Steamship | Richardson, Duck and Company | Stockton-on-Tees | United Kingdom | For private owner. |
| 29 July | Ethiope | Steamship | John Laird | Liverpool | United Kingdom | For African Mail Company. |
| July | Apurímac | Frigate | Richard & Henry Green | Blackwall Yard | United Kingdom | For Peruvian Navy. |
| July | Hound | Barque | Pickersgill & Miller | Sunderland | United Kingdom | For J. Shields. |
| July | Ocean Spray | Barque | Hylton Carr | Hylton Ferry | United Kingdom | For Moon & Co. |
| July | Robert and Sarah | Merchantman | Robert Thompson & Sons | Sunderland | United Kingdom | For R. Thompson. |
| July | Thermuthis | Brig | Messrs. Upham | Brixham | United Kingdom | For private owner. |
| July | William Henry | Merchantman | | "Point" | United Kingdom | For private owner. |
| 7 August | Blue Jacket | Clipper | Robert E. Jackson | East Boston, Massachusetts | United States | For Seccomb & Taylor. |
| 8 August | Ironside | Merchantman | | Banff | United Kingdom | For private owner. |
| 8 August | Liver | Cutter yacht | Messrs. Johnson & Majors | Liverpool | United Kingdom | For private owner. |
| 8 August | York | Full-rigged ship | Austin & Mills | Sunderland | United Kingdom | For John Harrison Allan. |
| 9 August | Testimonial | Barque | Scrafton | Middlesbrough | United Kingdom | For private owner. |
| 10 August | Falcon | Cruizer-class sloop | | Plymouth Dockyard | United Kingdom | For Royal Navy. |
| 10 August | New York | Steamship | Messrs. Tod & McGregor | Kelvinside | United Kingdom | For private owner. |
| 10 August | Tyne | Paddle steamer | Messrs. Miller, Ravenhill & Salkeld | Low Walker | United Kingdom | For Royal West India Mail Company. |
| 12 August | Oryol | Third rate | New Admiralty Shipyard | Saint Petersburg | Russia | For Imperial Russian Navy. |
| 15 August | Lady Grey | Merchantman | Watson | Banff | United Kingdom | For private owner. |
| 17 August | Alligator | Steamboat | Vulcan Foundry | Ayr | United Kingdom | For private owner. |
| 19 August | Hunter | Paddle steamer | Messrs. Scott & Co. | Greenock | United Kingdom | For Hunter River New Steam Navigation Company. |
| 22 August | Magnolia | Paddle steamer | J. Simonson | Greenpoint, New York | United States | For Southern Steamship Company. |
| 23 August | Napier | Medium clipper | William & George Gardner | Fell's Point, Maryland | United States | For Dawson & Hancock. |
| 26 August | Constellation | Sloop of war | Norfolk Naval Shipyard | Portsmouth, Virginia | United States | For United States Navy. |
| 26 August | Dom Pedro | Steamship | Pitcher | Northfleet | United Kingdom | For Luizo Braziliero Steam Company. |
| 26 August | Etna | Steamship | Messrs. Caird & Co. | Greenock | United Kingdom | For Cunard Line, or Messrs. G. & J. Burns. |
| 26 August | Pelter | Pelter-class gunboat | Pitcher | Northfleet | United Kingdom | For Royal Navy. |
| 26 August | Scamander | Steamship | Messrs. Stothart, Slaughter & Co. | Bristol | United Kingdom | For Messrs. Moss & Co. |
| 27 August | Blue Jacket | Clipper | Robert E. Jackson | East Boston, Massachusetts | United States | For Seccomb & Taylor. |
| August | Danube | Full-rigged ship | G. H. Parke | Quebec | (United Kingdom of Great Britain and Ireland) Province of Canada | For private owner. |
| August | Golden Horn | Barque | James Pile | Monkwearmouth | United Kingdom | For William Hay. |
| August | Jura | Paddle steamer | Machinen Fabrik Escher-Wyss | Zürich | Switzerland | For Société des Bateaux à Vapeur du lac du Neuchâtel. |
| August | Loevesteyn | Clipper | | | United Kingdom | For private owner. |
| August | Royal Family | Merchantman | Byers & Co. | Sunderland | United Kingdom | For John Rogers Watkins. |
| August | Tiberius | Barque | J. Barkes | Sunderland | United Kingdom | For E. T. Gourley & Son. |
| August | Van Der Heyt | Merchantman | | Stettin | Prussia | For M. F. Brunner. |
| August | Venelia | Merchantman | J. Hardie | Sunderland | United Kingdom | For Messrs. Joseph Shield & Co. |
| 5 September | Santa Claus | Medium clipper | Donald McKay | Boston, Massachusetts | United States | For Joseph Nickerson & Co. |
| 6 September | Cumming | Barque | R. H. Potts & Bros. | Sunderland | United Kingdom | For R. H. Potts & Bros. |
| 7 September | Sunny South | Extreme clipper | George Steers and Co | Williamsburg, New York | United States | For Napier, Johnson & Co. |
| 8 September | Ivor | Schooner | Ellis | Garth | United Kingdom | For private owner. |
| 8 September | Snake | Arrow-class gunvessel | | Woolwich Dockyard | United Kingdom | For Royal Navy. |
| 9 September | Chieftain | Barque | Thomas Waters | Bideford | United Kingdom | For Thomas Evans. |
| 9 September | Cynthia | Brig | Messrs. Brands & Scorgie | Aberdeen | United Kingdom | For private owner. |
| 9 September | Hesperus | Steamship | Messrs. C. Mitchell & Co. | Newcastle upon Tyne | United Kingdom | For Hamburg Gas Company. |
| 9 September | Loire | Steamship | Messrs. Vernon & Young, or Messrs, Thomas Vernon & Son. | Liverpool | United Kingdom | For private owner. |
| 9 September | Morna | Steamship | Messrs. Simons & Co | Whiteinch | United Kingdom | For Belfast and London Screw Steam Ship Company. |
| 9 September | Shuttle | Merchantman | Thomas Waters | Bideford | United Kingdom | For Messrs. Leach & Co. |
| 10 September | Sebastopol | Full-rigged ship | Arrow Leithead | Sunderland | United Kingdom | For M. Tweddell. |
| 14 September | Maid of the Mill | Brig | Messrs. Hodgson & Co | Blyth | United Kingdom | For J. Twizell and others. |
| 14 September | Silistria | Steamship | Messrs. Robert Hickson & Co. | Belfast | United Kingdom | For Edward Bates. |
| 23 September | Anna Baker | Barque | Messrs. Getty, Jones & Co. | Liverpool | United Kingdom | For Messrs Baker & Dyer. |
| 23 September | Pacific | Paddle steamer | Scott Russell | Millwall | United Kingdom | For Sydney & Melbourne Steam Packet Company. |
| 23 September | Pincher | Pelter-class gunboat | Pitcher | Northfleet | United Kingdom | For Royal Navy. |
| 23 September | Ypiranga | Gunboat | Arsenal de Marinha do Rio de Janeiro | Rio de Janeiro | Brazil | For Imperial Brazilian Navy. |
| 24 September | Ranger | Pelter-class gunboat | Pitcher | Northfleet | United Kingdom | For Royal Navy. |
| 25 September | Zingari | Steamship | Messrs. T. & W. Smith | North Shields | United Kingdom | For R. & W. Jackson. |
| 26 September | Pactolus | Steamship | Messrs. J. Read & Co. | Port Glasgow | United Kingdom | For Messrs. Lamport & Holt. |
| September | Proserpine | Steamship | Messrs. Denny & Rankin | Dumbarton | United Kingdom | For Messrs. Blackwood & Gordon. |
| 2 October | The Braes o' Moray | Merchantman | | Lossiemouth | United Kingdom | For private owner. |
| 2 October | William Aldam | Steamship | Messrs. Hoby & Co. | Renfrew | United Kingdom | For private owners. |
| 5 October | Alma | Full-rigged ship | Middle Dock Company | South Shields | United Kingdom | For Middle Dock Company. |
| 5 October | Hecla | Barque | Messrs. J. P. Denton & Co. | Hartlepool | United Kingdom | For Messrs. W. Ord & Co. |
| 7 October | Gleaner | Pelter-class gunboat | | Sheerness Dockyard | United Kingdom | For Royal Navy. |
| 7 October | Imperidor | Merchantman | John Laird | Liverpool | United Kingdom | For private owner |
| 7 October | Imperatriz | Steamship | John Laird | Birkenhead | United Kingdom | For South American Mail Steam Packet Company. |
| 7 October | Ruby | Pelter-class gunboat | | Sheerness Dockyard | United Kingdom | For Royal Navy. |
| 7 October | Sappho | Steamship | Messrs. Rennie, Johnson & Co. | Liverpool | United Kingdom | For Messrs. Gardner. |
| 7 October | Sunny South | Extreme clipper | George Steers | Williamsburg, New York | United States | For Napier, Johnson & Co. |
| 9 October | Burlington | Steamship | Messrs. Martin Samuelson & Co. | Hull | United Kingdom | For Messrs. Gee & Co. |
| 9 October | Not named | Brig | Messrs. Duthie & Co | Aberdeen | United Kingdom | For private owner. |
| 14 October | Dora | Merchantman | Patterson | Bristol | United Kingdom | For private owner. |
| 21 October | Empress | Steamship | Messrs. Mare & Co. | Blackwall | United Kingdom | For private owner. |
| 21 October | Queen | Steamship | Messrs. Mare & Co. | Blackwall | United Kingdom | For private owner. |
| 23 October | Liverpooliana | Full-rigged ship | Bank Quay Foundry | Warrington | United Kingdom | For John Longton, or Messrs. Charles Moore & Co. |
| 25 October | Not named | Troopship | Messrs. Mare | Blackwall | United Kingdom | For British Government. |
| 28 October | Charmer | Medium clipper | George W. Jackman | Newburyport, Massachusetts | United States | For Bush & Wildes. |
| October | Cimbria | Barque | | Littlehampton | United Kingdom | For private owner. |
| October | Egmond and Hoorne | Full-rigged ship | | | United Kingdom | For private owner. |
| 2 November | Assyrian | Clipper | Walter Hood & Co. | Aberdeen | United Kingdom | For Alexander Nicol. |
| 4 November | Zebra | Génie-class brig | | Lorient | France | For French Navy. |
| 6 November | Orion | Hood-class ship of the line | | Chatham Dockyard | United Kingdom | For Royal Navy. |
| 18 November | Elizabeth Barter | Brig | Messrs. Rennie, Johnson & Rankin | Liverpool | United Kingdom | For Messrs. Barter. |
| 21 November | Vittorio Emmanuelo | Steamship | Messrs. Mare & Co. | Blackwall | United Kingdom | For Trans-Atlantic Steam Packet Company (of Genoa). |
| 22 November | Adelaide | Clipper | A. C. Bell | New York | United States | For private owner |
| 22 November | Conflict | Clipper | Messrs. Cato, Miller & Co. | Liverpool | United Kingdom | For private owner. |
| 22 November | Excelsior | Steamship | Messrs. Coutts & Parkinson | Willington Quay | United Kingdom | For Northern Steam Company. |
| 22 November | Furness Miner | Schooner | Messrs. Watson & Allsup | Preston | United Kingdom | For Messrs. Fisher & Co. |
| 23 November | Alma | Merchantman | | Runcorn | United Kingdom | For Bridgwater Trust. |
| 26 November | Pylades | Pylades-class corvette | | Sheerness Dockyard | United Kingdom | For Royal Navy. |
| 29 November | Kosmopoliet | Full-rigged ship | Cornelis Gips en Zonen | Dordrecht | Netherlands | For Gebroeders Blussé. |
| November | General de Stuers | Clipper | | | United Kingdom | For private owner. |
| November | Inkermann | Barque | W. Pickersgill | Sunderland | United Kingdom | For E. Oliver. |
| November | John Linn | Full-rigged ship | Storms & King | Saint John | (United Kingdom of Great Britain and Ireland) Colony of New Brunswick | For private owner. |
| November | Lady Raglan | Barque | | | (United Kingdom of Great Britain and Ireland) Colony of Prince Edward Island | For private owner. |
| 7 December | Euterpe | Medium clipper | Horace Merriman | Rockland, Maine | United States | For Foster & Nickerson. |
| 18 December | Zebra | Steamship | Messrs. Caird & Co. | Greenock | United Kingdom | For Messrs. Burns & Macivor, or Messrs. G. & J. Burns. |
| 19 December | Wellington | Full-rigged ship | Messrs. Laing Bros. | North Shields | United Kingdom | For Messrs. Wait. |
| 20 December | Alma | Clipper | Messrs. Duthie & Cochar | Montrose | United Kingdom | For private owner. |
| 20 December | Mirage | Clipper | John Pile | West Hartlepool | United Kingdom | For private owner. |
| 21 December | Howden | Full-rigged ship | Messrs. Charles & William Earle | Hull | United Kingdom | For Messrs. Holderness & Chilton. |
| 21 December | Paterson | Paddle steamer | Messrs. Scott & Co. | Cartsdyke | United Kingdom | For Hunter River Steam Navigation Company. |
| 21 December | Propeller | Steamship | Messrs. T. D. Marshall | South Shields | United Kingdom | For Messrs. Brassey & Peto. |
| 21 December | Tempest | Steamship | Sandeman & McLaurin | Glasgow | United Kingdom | For Anchor Line. |
| 23 December | Cleator | Steamship | Messrs. Cato, Miller & Co. | Liverpool | United Kingdom | For Alfred Holt. |
| 23 December | Hermione | Clipper | Messrs. Cato, Miller & Co | Liverpool | United Kingdom | For private owner. |
| 23 December | Meander | Steamship | Messrs. Stothert, Slaughter & Co | Hotwells | United Kingdom | For Messrs. Moss & Co. |
| 24 December | James and Mary | Clipper | Dillon | Wicklow | United Kingdom | For Mr. Dillon. |
| 28 December | Salvador Packet | Barque | Clarke | Liverpool | United Kingdom | For private owner. |
| 28 December | Winifred | Full-rigged ship | Cram | Sandycroft | United Kingdom | For Messrs. Sharples, Jones & Co. |
| 29 December | Arctic Hero | Barque | George Booth | Sunderland | United Kingdom | For Rutherford & Nicholson. |
| 30 December | Robert Passenger | Barque | Havelock & Robson | Sunderland | United Kingdom | For Ledger & Co. |
| December | Alma | Schooner | | Bideford | United Kingdom | For private owner. |
| December | Amsterdam | Clipper | | | United Kingdom | For private owner. |
| December | Avery | Merchantman | Follett | Teignmouth | United Kingdom | For private owner. |
| December | Clio | Steamship | | | United Kingdom | For private ownew. |
| December | Europa | Steamship | Messrs. Mare | Blackwall | United Kingdom | For private owner. |
| December | France | Steamship | | Toulon | France | For private owner. |
| December | Indian | Steamship | Messrs. William Denny & Bros | Dumbarton | United Kingdom | For private owner. |
| December | Robert Bright | West Indiaman | J. Westacott | Barnstaple | United Kingdom | For Mr. Edwards and others. |
| December | Snowdrop | Barque | P. Gibson | Sunderland | United Kingdom | For J. Allcock. |
| December | Sprirt of the Age | Full-rigged ship | John Pile | Sunderland | United Kingdom | For T. Gibb & Co. |
| December | Wallachia | Merchantman | James Robinson, or J. & J. Robinson | Sunderland | United Kingdom | For Messrs. Marwoods. |
| Spring | Echo | Full-rigged ship | W. G. Russell | Quebec | (United Kingdom of Great Britain and Ireland) Province of Canada | For private owner. |
| Unknown date | Abyssinian | Merchantman | Lister & Bartram | Sunderland | United Kingdom | For Manson & others. |
| Unknown date | Adelaide | Steamship | Lupton and McDermott | Greenpoint, New York | United States | For Calais Steamboat Company. |
| Unknown date | Admiral | Barque | W. Crown | Sunderland | United Kingdom | For J. Patton. |
| Unknown date | Adonis | Snow | Havelock & Robson | Sunderland | United Kingdom | For J. Billing. |
| Unknown date | Albatross | Barque | Haswell | Sunderland | United Kingdom | For Mr. Wilkinson. |
| Unknown date | Albuera | Merchantman | | Moulmein | Burma | For private owner. |
| Unknown date | Alfred | Merchantman | James Laing | Sunderland | United Kingdom | For James Dowson & Co. |
| Unknown date | Alice Williams | Schooner | Mr. Bevans | Llanelly | United Kingdom | For H. Williams. |
| Unknown date | Amity | Merchantman | James Laing | Sunderland | United Kingdom | For Smith, Scurfield & Co. |
| Unknown date | Anthony B. Neilson | Schooner | George Steers | Williamsburg, New York | United States | For Thomas Aitken, William Anderson, Peter Bayley, George W. Christopher, John F. Clark, Gideon L. Mapes and Talph Noble. |
| Unknown date | Arago | Survey ship | Fardy & Bros. | Baltimore, Maryland | United States | For United States Coast Survey. |
| Unknown date | Balkan | Barque | | Blyth | United Kingdom | For George Dryden. |
| Unknown date | Balmoral | Barque | W. Naisby | Sunderland | United Kingdom | For W. Davison. |
| Unknown date | Basileia | Merchantman | George Barker | Sunderland | United Kingdom | For Rickinson & Co. |
| Unknown date | Betsey | Snow | Lister & Bartram | Sunderland | United Kingdom | For D. Mackie. |
| Unknown date | Beverley | Barque | Todd & Brown | Sunderland | United Kingdom | For T. Tindall. |
| Unknown date | Boston Light | Medium clipper | E. & H. O. Briggs | South Boston, Massachusetts | United States | For James Huckings & Sons. |
| Unknown date | Bowditch | Survey ship | | | United States | For United States Coast Survey. |
| Unknown date | Brackley | Schooner | Brundrit & Whiteway | Runcorn | United Kingdom | For Brundrit & Whiteway. |
| Unknown date | Brothers | Barque | George Short | South Hylton | United Kingdom | For Mr. Greenwell. |
| Unknown date | Caledonia | Tug | Pusey & Jones | Wilmington, Delaware | United States | For James Cathcart Johnson. |
| Unknown date | Calliance | Full-rigged ship | Haswell | Sunderland | United Kingdom | For John Hay. |
| Unknown date | Cambria | Steamship | | River Tye | United Kingdom | For private owner. |
| Unknown date | Cambrian | Snow | William Pile Jr. | Sunderland | United Kingdom | For Mr. Langton. |
| Unknown date | Canvasback | Medium clipper | Abraham & Ashcroft | Baltimore, Maryland | United States | For Oelrich & Lurman. |
| Unknown date | Carinthia | Brig | George Short | South Hylton | United Kingdom | For W. Macky. |
| Unknown date | Catherine Morrison | Barque | J. Watson | Pallion | United Kingdom | For J. Morrison. |
| Unknown date | Charles Moore | Paddle steamer | | New York | United States | For Southern Steam Ship Company. |
| Unknown date | Charlotte Anne | Barque | Messrs. J. & R. White | Cowes | United Kingdom | For private owner. |
| Unknown date | Chase | Merchantman | W. Pile | Sunderland | United Kingdom | For Dale & Co. |
| Unknown date | Clarendon | Merchantman | A. Leslie & Co. | Newcastle upon Tyne | United Kingdom | For private owner. |
| Unknown date | Clifton Hall | Barque | Sykes & Co. | Sunderland | United Kingdom | For Edward Oliver. |
| Unknown date | Clipper City | Schooner | | Manitowoc, Wisconsin | United Kingdom | For private owner. |
| Unknown date | Columba | Full-rigged ship | Bradley Potts & Co. | Pallion | United Kingdom | For Douglass & Co. |
| Unknown date | Corral Queen | Barque | E. Bailey | Pallion | United Kingdom | For Bennett & Co. |
| Unknown date | Corsican | Barque | Forrest & Jackson | Hylton | United Kingdom | For J. Hay. |
| Unknown date | Crest of the Wave | Medium clipper | | Thomaston, Maine | United States | For M. R. Ludwig. |
| Unknown date | Damietta | Barque | John Smith | Pallion | United Kingdom | For Joyce & Co. |
| Unknown date | Dashaway | Clipper | J. Rideout | Hallowell, Maine | United States | For Read, Page & Co. |
| Unknown date | Deer Slayer | Merchantman | | Warrington | United Kingdom | For private owner. |
| Unknown date | Deptford | Barque | Hodgson & Gardner | North Hylton | United Kingdom | For J. Robinson. |
| Unknown date | Dewdrop | Steam yacht | William Bayley | Ipswich | United Kingdom | For private owner. |
| Unknown date | Diadem | Merchantman | George Barker | Sunderland | United Kingdom | For Smith & Co. |
| Unknown date | Dinornis | Steamship | Messrs. John Reid & Co. | Glasgow | United Kingdom | For Australasian Pacific Steam Navigation Company. |
| Unknown date | Driver | Barque | Currier and Townshend | Newburyport, Massachusetts | United States | For David Ogden et al. |
| Unknown date | Druid | Barque | Peter Auston | Sunderland | United Kingdom | For D. Langton. |
| Unknown date | Durus | Snow | Michael Byers & Co. | Sunderland | United Kingdom | For W. Kirkwood. |
| Unknown date | Eamont | Schooner | White | Cowes | United Kingdom | For Dent & Co. |
| Unknown date | Eden | Merchantman | Arrow Leithead | Sunderland | United Kingdom | For John Hay. |
| Unknown date | Eena | Schooner | Bailey | Pallion | United Kingdom | For E. Hickey. |
| Unknown date | Elizabeth Barclay | Schooner | | | United Kingdom | For private owner. |
| Unknown date | Elizabeth F. Willetts | Clipper | Charles Mallory | Mystic, Connecticut | United States | For Charles Mallory. |
| Unknown date | Elizabeths | Merchantman | Lister & Bartram | Sunderland | United Kingdom | For E. Gare. |
| Unknown date | Emerald | Merchantman | Wilson Chilton | Sunderland | United Kingdom | For private owner. |
| Unknown date | Emily Farnum | Clipper | George Raynes | Portsmouth, New Hampshire | United States | For W. Jones & Co. |
| Unknown date | Englishman | Snow | W. Taylor & Son | Sunderland | United Kingdom | For Mr. Sharland. |
| Unknown date | Enthusiast | Barque | William Harkess | Sunderland | United Kingdom | For Longton & Co. |
| Unknown date | Escort | Full-rigged ship | G. W. & W. J. Hall | Sunderland | United Kingdom | For Mr. Temperley. |
| Unknown date | Esmeralda | Barque | | Sunderland | United Kingdom | For Towse & Co. |
| Unknown date | Ethersey | Flat | | Bombay | India | For British East India Company. |
| Unknown date | Euphrates | Barque | Pile & Smart | Sunderland | United Kingdom | For P. Tindall. |
| Unknown date | Excelsior | Barque | Rawson & Watson | Sunderland | United Kingdom | For E. H. Hogg. |
| Unknown date | Faith | Snow | John Reay | North Hylton | United Kingdom | For Ray & Son. |
| Unknown date | Fanny McHenry | Clipper | A. & G. T. Sampson | East Boston, Massachusetts | United States | For G. McHenry & Co. |
| Unknown date | Fleetwing | Medium clipper | Hayden & Cudworth | Medford, Massachusetts | United States | For Crowell, Brooks & Co. |
| Unknown date | Fox | Steam yacht | Alexander Hall and Sons | Aberdeen | United Kingdom | For Richard Sutton. |
| Unknown date | Freedom | Barque | Hylton Carr | North Hylton | United Kingdom | For Harper and others. |
| Unknown date | Ganges | Clipper | Hugh R. McKay | East Boston, Massachusetts | United States | For W. S. Bullard. |
| Unknown date | George Mangham | Schooner | | | United States | For private owner. |
| Unknown date | Gem | Steamship | James Henderson & Son | Renfrew | United Kingdom | For private owner. |
| Unknown date | George Marshall | Full-rigged ship | | Newcastle upon Tyne | United Kingdom | For private owner. |
| Unknown date | Golddigger | Snow | John Smith | Pallion | United Kingdom | For G. Gorton. |
| Unknown date | Gray Cloud | Paddle steamer | | Elizabeth, Pennsylvania | United States | For private owner. |
| Unknown date | Great Britain | Full-rigged ship | George Barker | Sunderland | United Kingdom | For Douglas & Co. |
| Unknown date | Great Northern | Steamship | James Laing | Sunderland | United Kingdom | For Richard Young. |
| Unknown date | Golden Horn | Clipper | Clark & Wood | Wiscasset, Maine | United States | For H. Clark. |
| Unknown date | Golden Rule | Clipper | Hitchcock & Co. | Damariscotta, Maine | United States | For F. Nickerson & Co. |
| Unknown date | Grace Darling | Medium clipper | E. & H. O. Briggs | South Boston, Massachusetts | United States | For Charles B. Fessenden. |
| Unknown date | Granite State | Clipper | Badger & Co. | Portsmouth, New Hampshire | United States | For H. D. Walker & Co. |
| Unknown date | Haidee | Clipper | | Providence, Rhode Island | United States | For private owner. |
| Unknown date | Haltwhistle | Merchantman | M. Twedell | Sunderland | United Kingdom | For M. Twedell. |
| Unknown date | Harbinger | Barque | J. Barkes | Sunderland | United Kingdom | For Gourley & Co. |
| Unknown date | Harvey Birch | Clipper | Irons & Grinnell | Mystic, Connecticut | United States | For J. H. Brower & Co. |
| Unknown date | Herald of the Morning | Full-rigged ship | Storm & King | Saint John | (United Kingdom of Great Britain and Ireland) Colony of New Brunswick | For George King, John Storm and James Thompson. |
| Unknown date | Henry Metcalfe | Merchantman | Forrest & Co. | Sunderland | United Kingdom | For E. Metcalfe. |
| Unknown date | Heron | Snow | R. H. Potts & Bros. | Sunderland | United Kingdom | For Potts Bros. |
| Unknown date | Hōō Maru | Frigate | Uraga Shipyard | Uraga | Japan | For Tokugawa Navy. |
| Unknown date | Indiaman | Clipper | Hugh R. McKay | East Boston, Massachusetts | United States | For Sampson & Tappan. |
| Unknown date | Isabellas | Merchantman | Hylton Carr | South Hylton | United Kingdom | For James & Elizabeth Dowey. |
| Unknown date | Island Queen | Barque | S. Hodgson | Sunderland | United Kingdom | For H. Wheatley. |
| Unknown date | Isle of Thanet | Barque | W. Petrie | Sunderland | United Kingdom | For Mr. Mitcheson. |
| Unknown date | John Elliott Thayer | Clipper | Paul Curtis | East Boston, Massachusetts | United States | For Enoch Train & Co. |
| Unknown date | John L. Lockwood | Paddle steamer | | Athens, New York | United States | For private owner. |
| Unknown date | John Milton | Merchantman | Reuben Fish | New Bedford, Massachusetts | United States | For Edward Mott Robinson. |
| Unknown date | Joshua & Mary | Snow | John Smith | Sunderland | United Kingdom | For Miller & Co. |
| Unknown date | Kit Carson | Clipper | Shiverick Brothers | East Denniss, Massachusetts | United States | For Prince S. Crowell. |
| Unknown date | Lan Tong | Barque | | Sunderland | United Kingdom | For private owner. |
| Unknown date | Leonard Wright | Snow | Hume & Easson | Sunderland | United Kingdom | For Leonard Wright. |
| Unknown date | Liddesdale | Barque | James Hardie | Southwick | United Kingdom | For W. Black. |
| Unknown date | Macheon | Barque | | River Wear | United Kingdom | For Gilbert Ward. |
| Unknown date | Madras | Barque | S. Hodgson, or Hodgson, Benjamin & Co, or Stothard | Sunderland | United Kingdom | For George Avery. |
| Unknown date | Maid of the Mill | Snow | Bowman and Drummond | Blyth | United Kingdom | For Mr. Twizell. |
| Unknown date | Maize | Snow | R. Reay | Sunderland | United Kingdom | For Ray & Son. |
| Unknown date | Mahlon Williamson | Barque | | Wilmington, Delaware | United States | For Vance & O. |
| Unknown date | Mary | Clipper | Benjamin Dutton | Marblehead, Massachusetts | United States | For Edward Kimball. |
| Unknown date | Mary Ogden | Clipper | Chase & Davies | Providence, Rhode Island | United States | For G. Buckley. |
| Unknown date | Mary Robinson | Clipper | Trufand and Drummond | Bath, Maine | United States | For E. M. Robinson. |
| Unknown date | Matius Causino | Merchantman | Messrs. W. J. Myers, Sons, & Co. | Saint John | (United Kingdom of Great Britain and Ireland) Colony of New Brunswick | For private owner. |
| Unknown date | Metacomet | Paddle steamer | | New York | United States | For private owner. |
| Unknown date | Monarch of the Seas | Clipper | Roosevelt & Joyce | New York | United States | For Lawrence Giles & Co. |
| Unknown date | Morning Glory | Clipper | | Portsmouth, New Hampshire | United States | For J. Goodwin. |
| Unknown date | Napier | Lighter | James Hardie | Sunderland | United Kingdom | For James Hardie. |
| Unknown date | Neptune | Full-rigged ship | G. Shevill | Sunderland | United Kingdom | For Ogden & Co. |
| Unknown date | Neptune's Favourite | Medium clipper | Jotham Stetson | Chelsea, Massachusetts | United States | For H. A. Kelly & Co. |
| Unknown date | Newcastle | Barque | James Hardie | Sunderland | United Kingdom | For Middle Dock Company. |
| Unknown date | New Era | Full-rigged ship | | Bath, Maine | United Kingdom | For private owner. |
| Unknown date | New Era | Merchantman | Sykes & Co | Sunderland | United Kingdom | For Wait & Co. |
| Unknown date | Norman | Full-rigged ship | Peter Austin | Sunderland | United Kingdom | For W. Stevens. |
| Unknown date | Norwood | Full-rigged ship | | Sunderland | United Kingdom | For Messrs. J. H. Luscombe. |
| Unknown date | Ocean Chief | Clipper | J. & C. Morton | Thomaston, Maine | United States | For J. & C. Morton |
| Unknown date | Ocean Rover | Clipper | Tobey & Littlefield | Portsmouth, New Hampshire | United States | For R. H. Tucker and others. |
| Unknown date | Panther | Medium clipper | Paul Curtis | Medford, Massachusetts | United States | For R. C. Mackay & Sons. |
| Unknown date | Pennsylvania | Paddle steamer | | | United States | For private owner. |
| Unknown date | Plymouth Rock | Steamboat | | New York | United States | For private owner. |
| Unknown date | Port Jackson | Full-rigged ship | John Pile | Sunderland | United Kingdom | For Glaister & Co. |
| Unknown date | Prima Donna | Merchantman | Pearson | Sunderland | United Kingdom | For private owner. |
| Unknown date | Pruth | Barque | William Crown | Sunderland | United Kingdom | For William Hay. |
| Unknown date | Quaker City | Paddle steamer | | Philadelphia, Pennsylvania | United States | For private owner. |
| Unknown date | Queen of the North | Barque | J. Pickersgill, or William Pickersgill | Sunderland | United Kingdom | For private owner. |
| Unknown date | Queen of the Seas | Clipper | James Smith | Liverpool | United Kingdom | For Fox Line. |
| Unknown date | Queen of the West | Paddle steamer | | Cincinnati, Ohio | United States | For private owner. |
| Unknown date | Rack | Lighter | J. Hardie | Sunderland | United Kingdom | For William Hay. |
| Unknown date | Rambler | Clipper | Hayden & Cudworth | Medford, Massachusetts | United States | For Baxter Bros. and Israel Nash. |
| Unknown date | Retriever | Barque | Bank Quay Foundry Co. | Warrington | United Kingdom | For Leech, Harrison & Forward. |
| Unknown date | Robert Morrison | Merchantman | | River Wear | United Kingdom | For Mr. Morrison. |
| Unknown date | Robin Hood | Extreme clipper | Hayde & Cudworth | Medford, Massachusetts | United States | For Howes & Crowell. |
| Unknown date | Ruby | Fishing trawler | John Barter | Brixham | United Kingdom | For James Evans & Peter Loye. |
| Unknown date | Runnymede | Full-rigged ship | | Sunderland | United Kingdom | For T. Brass & Co. |
| Unknown date | Saracen | Clipper | E. & H. O. Briggs | East Boston, Massachusetts | United States | For Curtis & Peabody. |
| Unknown date | Satellite | Paddle tug | | New York | United States | For private owner. |
| Unknown date | Saxon King | Merchantman | J. & R. Mils | Sunderland | United Kingdom | For Langton & Co. |
| Unknown date | Sea Bird | Paddle steamer | Benjamin Terry | Keyport, New Jersey | United States | For E. H. Delk. |
| Unknown date | Silistria | Merchantman | Robert Hickson | Belfast | United Kingdom | For Edward Bates. |
| Unknownndate | Russian ship Sinop | Ship of the line | | Nikolaieff | Russia | For Imperial Russian Navy. |
| Unknown date | Sir Charles Napier | Barque | Todd & Brown | Sunderland | United Kingdom | For Thomas H. Rutherford. |
| Unknown date | Spirit of the Deep | Full-rigged ship | J. T. Allcock | Sunderland | United Kingdom | For Donald Macdonald. |
| Unknown date | Star of the East | Barque | John Reed | Sunderland | United Kingdom | For private owner. |
| Unknown date | Starr King | Clipper | George W. Jackman, Jr. | Newburyport, Massachusetts | United States | For Baker & Morrill and Bates & Thaxter. |
| Unknown date | Stentor | Barque | | | (United Kingdom of Great Britain and Ireland) Colony of Nova Scotia | For private owner. |
| Unknown date | Stuart Wortley | Full-rigged ship | John Smith | Pallion | United Kingdom | For George Hodgkinson. |
| Unknown date | Switzerland | Paddle steamer | | Cincinnati, Ohio | United States | For private owner. |
| Unknown date | Talisman | Medium clipper | Metcalf & Norris | Damariscotta, Maine | United States | For Crocker & Warren. |
| Unknown date | Tennessee | Paddle Steamer | | Baltimore, Maryland | United States | For Texas Line. |
| Unknown date | Thessalia | Merchantman | J. & J. Robinson | Sunderland | United Kingdom | For Mr. Marwood. |
| Unknown date | Toledo | Cargo liner | Benjamin Buhl Jones | Buffalo, New York | United States | For American Transportation Corporation. |
| Unknown date | Tyne | Sloop | Halls | Sunderland | United Kingdom | For R. Greenwell Jr. |
| Unknown date | Tyne | Merchantman | Bartram & Lister | Sunderland | United Kingdom | For Mr. Henderson, or Henderson & Co. |
| Unknown date | Varina | Schooner | Fardy Bros. | Baltimore, Maryland | United States | For United States Coast Survey. |
| Unknown date | Venus | Paddle steamer | Mare & Co | Blackwall | United Kingdom | For private owner. |
| Unknown date | Victoria | Paddle tug | | | United Kingdom | For William Watkins Ltd. |
| Unknown date | Vulcan | Merchantman | James Laing | Sunderland | United Kingdom | For private owner. |
| Unknown date | Vulture | Snow | R. H. Potts & Bros | Sunderland | United Kingdom | For Potts & Co. |
| Unknown date | Whalton | Snow | Jobling & Co. | Sunderland | United Kingdom | For Headly & Co. |
| Unknown date | Wild Wave | Clipper | G. H. Ferrin | Richmond, Maine | United States | For Benjamin Bangs. |
| Unknown date | Willard | Barque | | Yarmouth, Maine | United States | For private owner. |
| Unknown date | William and Jane | Full-rigged ship | | | United States | For private owner. |
| Unknown date | William Laytin | Merchantman | | Williamsburg, New York | United States | For private owner. |
| Unknown date | William Penn | Snow | Edward Potts | Seaham | United Kingdom | For Mr. Andrews. |
| Unknown date | William Starkey | Pilot boat | Benjamin F. Delano | Medford, Massachusetts | United States | For W. W. Goddard. |
| Unknown date | Windward | Clipper | Trufant & Drummond | Bath, Maine | United States | For private owner. |
| Unknown date | Woodcock | Packet ship | | New York | United States | For private owner. |
| Unknown date | Wizard King | Clipper | T. J. Southard | Richmond, Maine | United States | For T. J. Southard. |
| Unknown date | Yankee Ranger | Clipper | | Rockland, Maine | United States | For Abbott, Kimball & Co. |
| Unknown date | Young England | Barque | | River Wear | United Kingdom | For private owner. |
