= French ship Tage =

At least two ships of the French Navy have been named Tage:

- Tage, a Hercule-class ship of the line launched in 1847 and broken up in 1896.
- Tage, a protected cruiser launched in 1886 and struck in 1910.
