= French ship Jemmapes =

Three French ships of the French Navy have borne the name Jemmapes in honour of the Battle of Jemmapes:

== Ships named Jemmapes ==
- Jemmapes, a Téméraire-class 74-gun ship of the line.
- Jemmapes, a 100-gun Hercule-class ship of the line.
- Jemmapes, a coastal defense ironclad launched in 1892 and struck 1922.
