= French ship Ulm =

French ship Ulm may refer to the following ships of the French Navy:

- French ship Ulm (1809), a Téméraire-class 74-gun ship of the line
- French ship Ulm (1854), a 100-gun Hercule-class ship of the line
