= USS Mobile =

USS Mobile may refer to:

- USS Mobile, a former name of SS Republic (1853)
- USS Mobile (1862), the former Confederate blockade runner Tennessee originally launched in 1854
- USS Mobile (ID-4030), the former German liner SS Cleveland used to transport U.S. troops home from Europe after World War I
- USS Mobile (CL-63), a Cleveland-class light cruiser
- USS Mobile (LKA-115), a Charleston-class amphibious cargo ship
- USS Mobile Bay (CG-53), a Ticonderoga-class guided-missile cruiser
- USS Mobile (LCS-26), an Independence-class littoral combat ship
