= French ship Eylau (1856) =

Ship of the line of the French Navy

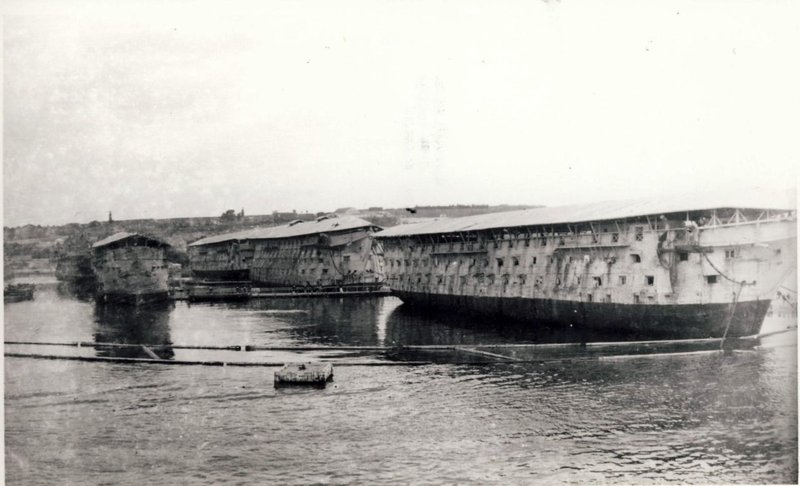
- Eylau as a hulk in Toulon (foreground)

History

Second French Empire
- Name: Eylau
- Namesake: Battle of Eylau
- Ordered: Early 1830s as sailing ship Éole, re-ordered 13 November 1852 as steam-powered ship
- Builder: Arsenal de Toulon
- Laid down: August 1833
- Launched: 15 May 1856
- Commissioned: 8 March 1857
- Decommissioned: 25 February 1865
- Renamed: Eylau, 23 November 1839
- Reclassified: Converted into troopship, 1862–1863; As a barracks ship, 22 February 1877
- Stricken: 22 February 1877
- Fate: Scrapped, 1905

General characteristics (as built)
- Class & type: Hercule-class ship of the line
- Displacement: 5,023 t (4,944 long tons)
- Length: 68.72 m (225 ft 6 in) (waterline)
- Beam: 16.8 m (55 ft 1 in)
- Draught: 8.16 m (26 ft 9 in) (full load)
- Depth of hold: 8.07 m (26 ft 6 in)
- Installed power: 3,600 PS (2,600 kW)
- Propulsion: 2 steam engines
- Sail plan: Ship rigged
- Complement: 913
- Armament: Lower gundeck: 18 × 36 pdr cannon; 16 × 223.3 mm (8.8 in) Paixhans guns; Upper gundeck: 34 × 30 pdr cannon; Quarterdeck and forecastle: 20 × 30 pdr cannon; 2 × 163 mm (6.4 in) rifled muzzle-loading guns

Eylau was ordered as one of fourteen second-rank, 100-gun sailing Hercule-class ship of the line for the French Navy, but was converted to a 90-gun steam-powered ship in the 1850s while under construction. Completed in 1857 the ship participated in the Second Italian War of Independence in 1859 and the initial stages of the Second French intervention in Mexico before she was converted into a troopship in 1862 or 1863. Eylau was hulked in 1877 and served as a barracks ship until she was scrapped in 1905.

== Description ==
The Hector-class ships were enlarged versions of the 80-gun Bucentaure-class ships of the line that had been designed by naval architect Jacques-Noël Sané. The conversion to steam power involved cutting the ship's frame in half amidships and building a new section to house the propulsion machinery and coal bunkers, which reduced her armament to 90 guns. Eylau had a length at the waterline of 68.72 meters (225 ft 6 in), a beam of 16.8 meters (55 ft 1 in) and a depth of hold of 8.07 meters (26 ft 6 in). The ship displaced 5,023 metric tons (4,944 long tons) and had a draught of 8.16 meters (26 ft 9 in) at deep load. Her crew numbered 913 officers and ratings. Details are lacking on Eylau's propulsion machinery, the only information available is that her two steam engines were rated at 900 nominal horsepower and produced 3,600 metric horsepower (2,600 kW).

The ship's consisted of eighteen 36-pounder (174.8 mm (6.9 in)) smoothbore cannon and sixteen 223.3 mm (8.8 in) Paixhans guns on the lower gundeck and thirty-four 30-pounder 164.7 mm (6.5 in) cannon on the upper gundeck. On the quarterdeck and forecastle were twenty 30-pounder cannon and a pair of 163 mm (6.4 in) rifled muzzle-loading guns.

== Construction and career ==
The ship was ordered in the early 1830s under the name Éole and was laid down at the Arsenal de Toulon in August 1833. She was renamed Eylau on 23 November 1839 and was ordered to be converted to steam power on 13 November 1852. The conversion began on 5 July 1852 and the ship was launched on 15 May 1856. The ship was commissioned on 8 March 1857. She was used as a hulk in Toulon from 1877, and broken up in 1905.
