= French ship Donawerth (1854) =

Ship of the line of the French Navy

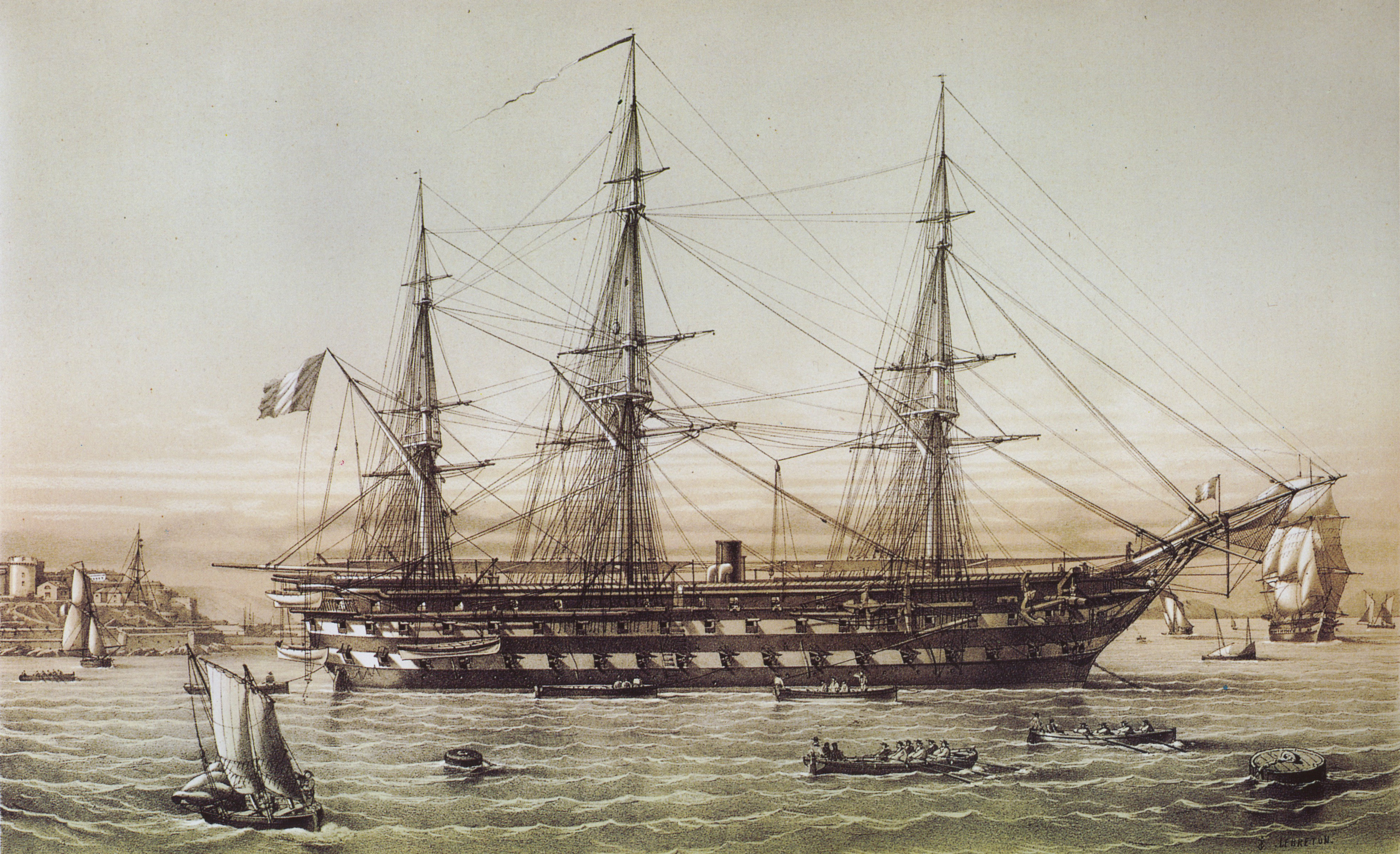
- The Jean Bart, sister-ship of Donawerth. Drawing by Louis Le Breton

History

France
- Name: Donawerth
- Builder: Arsenal de Lorient
- Laid down: 27 July 1827
- Launched: 15 February 1854
- Completed: July 1854
- Commissioned: 1 May 1854
- Out of service: Ship reclassified=
- Renamed: From Alexandre, 23 November 1839
- Fate: Scrapped, 1897

General characteristics (as built)
- Class & type: Donawerth-class ship of the line
- Displacement: 4,231 tonnes
- Length: 60.5 m (198 ft 6 in) (gun deck)
- Beam: 16.28 m (53 ft 5 in)
- Draught: 8.2 m (26 ft 11 in)=
- Depth: 8.05 m (26 ft 5 in)
- Installed power: 1,175 ihp (1,191 PS; 876 kW)
- Propulsion: 1 × shaft; 1 × Horizontal-return connecting rod-steam engine
- Sail plan: Full-rigged ship
- Speed: 9 knots (17 km/h; 10 mph)
- Complement: 814
- Armament: 80 muzzle-loading, smoothbore guns; Lower gun deck: 16 × 36-pounder long guns, 14 × 22 cm (8.7 in) long Paixhans guns; Upper gun deck: 30 × 30-pounder short guns; Forecastle & Quarterdeck: 2 × 16 cm (6.3 in) rifled guns, 18 × 30 pdr carronades

Donawerth was the lead ship of her class of steam-powered, third-rate, 80 gun ships of the line built for the French Navy during the 1850s. She had been laid down as a Suffren-class sailing ship of the line, but remained on the stocks until she was chosen for conversion to steam power in 1854. The ship played a minor role in the Crimean War of 1854–1855. Donaworth exchanged names with Jean Bart in 1868, and subsequently served as a training ship.

== Description ==
Donawerth had a length of 60.5 metres (198 ft 6 in) at the gun deck a beam of 16.28 metres (53 ft 5 in) and a depth of hold of 8.05 metres (26 ft 5 in). The ship displaced 4,231 tonnes and had a mean draught of 7.4 metres (24 ft 3 in). Her crew numbered 814 officers and ratings. She was powered by a horizontal-return connecting rod-steam engine that drove the single propeller shaft. The engine, built by Mazeline, was rated at 450 nominal horsepower and produced 1,175 indicated horsepower (1,191 PS; 876 kW). Donawerth had a speed of 9 knots (17 km/h; 10 mph) under steam. She was fitted with three masts and ship rigged like the 80-gun sailing ships of the line in service.

The muzzle-loading, smoothbore armament of Donawerth consisted of sixteen 36-pounder long guns and fourteen 22 cm (8.7 in) Paixhans guns on the lower gun deck. On the upper gundeck were twenty-four 30-pound short guns. On the quarterdeck and forecastle were a total of two 16 cm (6.3 in) rifled guns and eighteen 30-pounder carronades.

== Construction and career ==
Donaworth had been laid down as a 90-gun 3rd-rank Suffren-class ship of the line on 27 July 1827 at the Arsenal de Lorient under the name of Alexandre, but construction was suspended. The ship was renamed Donawerth on 23 November 1839. Her incomplete hull was kept in a covered slipway until she was launched on 15 February 1854. The ship was commissioned on 1 May 1853 and completed in July. Donawerth served as a troopship during the Crimean War.

The ship's conversion into a steam-powered ship was ordered on 19 October 1854, although work did not begin until 5 May 1856 at the Arsenal de Cherbourg. Donawerth was re-launched on 27 March 1857 and completed in November. The ship was recommissioned on 1 January 1858. Donawerth exchanged names with Jean Bart in 1868 and she was converted into a training ship for naval cadets.
