= French ship Fleurus (1853) =

French naval ship

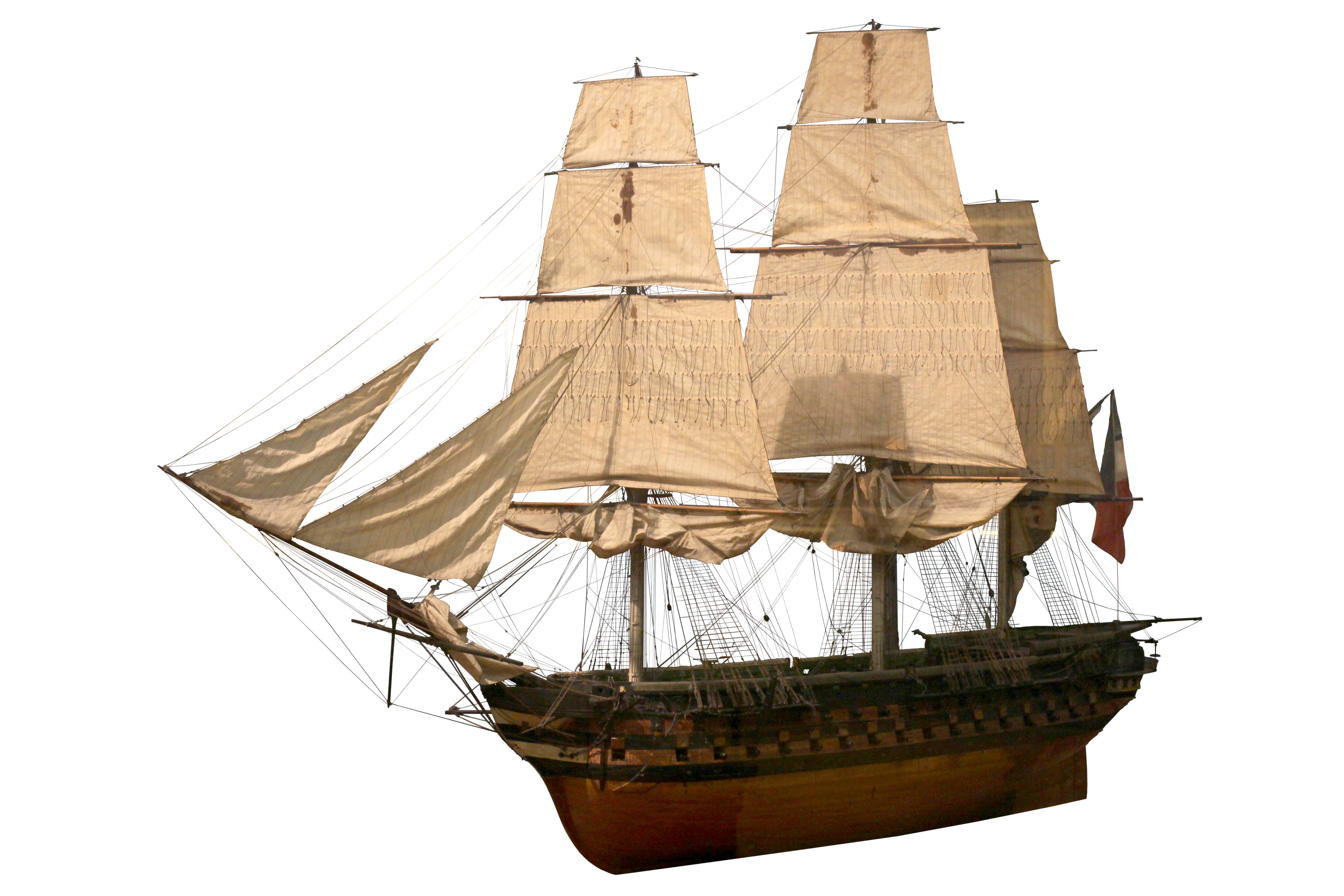
- 1/40th-scale model of the 100-gun Hercule, lead ship of Fleurus ' class, on display at the Musée national de la Marine.

History

France
- Name: Fleurus
- Namesake: Battle of Ligny, also known as Battle of Fleurus
- Builder: Toulon
- Laid down: April 1825
- Launched: 2 December 1853
- In service: 1855
- Stricken: 17 August 1869
- Fate: Scrapped

General characteristics
- Class & type: Hercule class
- Displacement: 4440 tonnes
- Length: 62.50
- Beam: 16.20
- Draught: 8.23
- Sail plan: 3150 m^{2} of sails
- Complement: 955 men
- Armament: 100 guns, including: 32 × 30-pounder long guns (lower deck); 30 × 30-pounder short guns (upper deck); 30 30-pounder carronades (open deck); 4 × 18-pounder long guns (open deck)
- Armour: timber

Fleurus was a late 100-gun Hercule-class ship of the line of the French Navy, transformed into a sail and steam ship.

== Service history ==
Ordered in 1825 as Brianée and soon renamed Dauphin Royal, Fleurus was laid down in 1825 but not completed before 1855. She took her definitive name after the July Revolution, on 9 August 1830.

From January 1855, she conducted her engine trials. She proceeded to the Black Sea to take part in the Crimean War. In 1862, she served as a troopship for the French intervention in Mexico.

She finished her career as a hulk in Saigon, headquarters to the French naval division of Indochina.
