= French ship Austerlitz (1852) =

Ship of the line of the French Navy

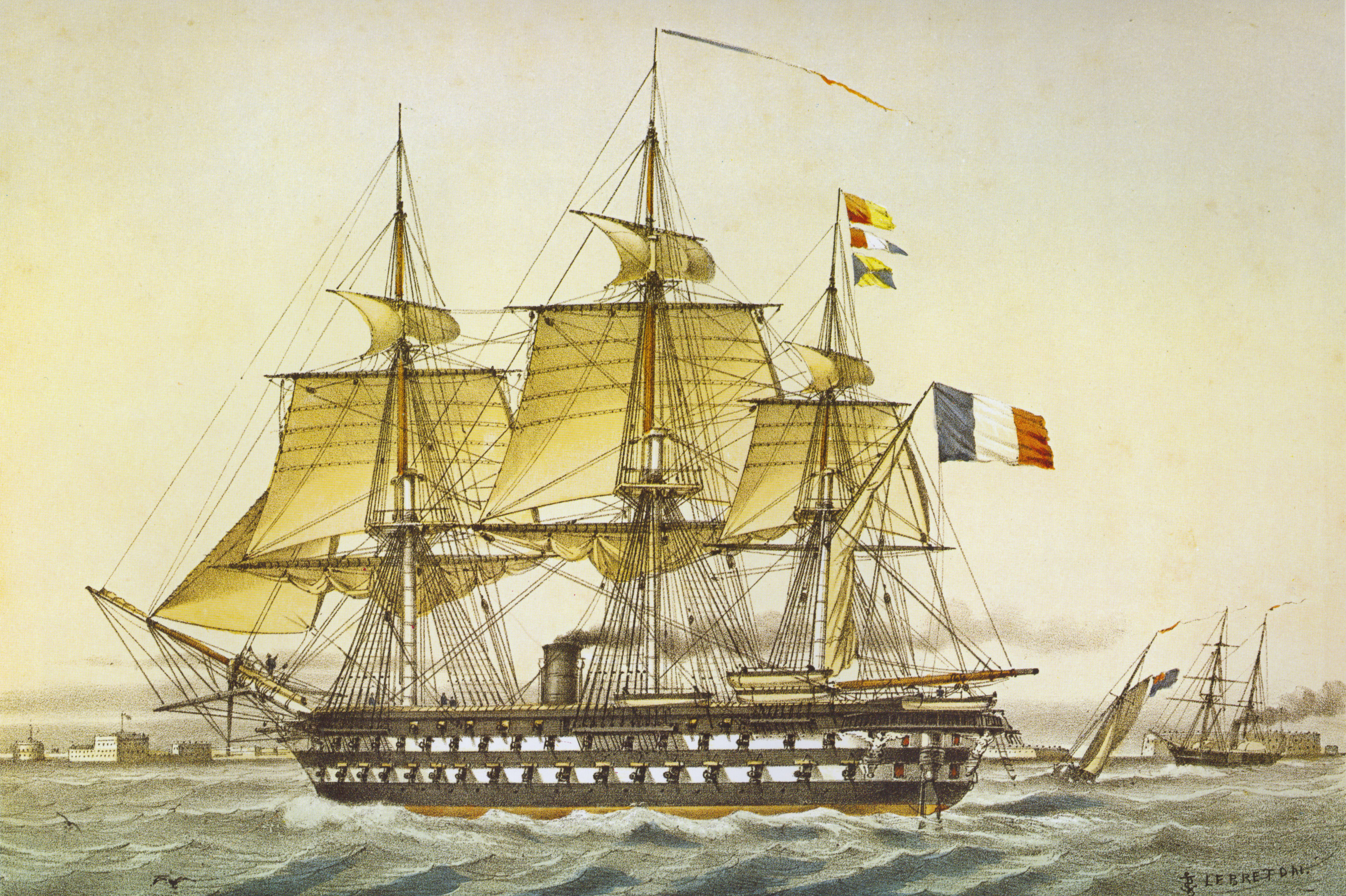
- The Austerlitz in 1854, drawing by Louis Le Breton

History

France
- Namesake: Battle of Austerlitz
- Builder: Cherbourg
- Laid down: 17 August 1832
- Launched: 15 September 1852
- Fate: Scrapped, 1895

General characteristics
- Class & type: Hercule class
- Displacement: 4500 tonnes
- Length: 70.62 m (231.7 ft)
- Beam: 16.80 m (55.1 ft)
- Draught: 7.67 m (25.2 ft)
- Propulsion: Sail; Steam engine after 1850, 500 shp
- Speed: 10.2 knots (18.9 km/h; 11.7 mph)
- Complement: 883
- Armament: 100 guns

The Austerlitz was a late 100-gun Hercule-class ship of the line of the French Navy.

== Service history ==
Laid down as Ajax, she was renamed Austerlitz on 28 November 1839, still on keel.

In 1850, her rigging was changed for that of a 90-gun, and a steam engine was installed.

On 19 September 1854, she ran aground in the Ledsund, in Åland, Grand Duchy of Finland. She was refloated after throwing sixteen of her cannon overboard. She took part in operations in the Black Sea in 1854. On 16 April 1855, Austerlitz ran aground at South Foreland, Kent, United Kingdom in foggy weather. She was refloated the next day.

From 1871, she was used as a prison hulk of prisoners of the Paris Commune. Between 1874 and 1894, she was used as a school ship. She was eventually broken up in 1895.
