= French ship Hercule (1836) =

Ship of the line of the French Navy

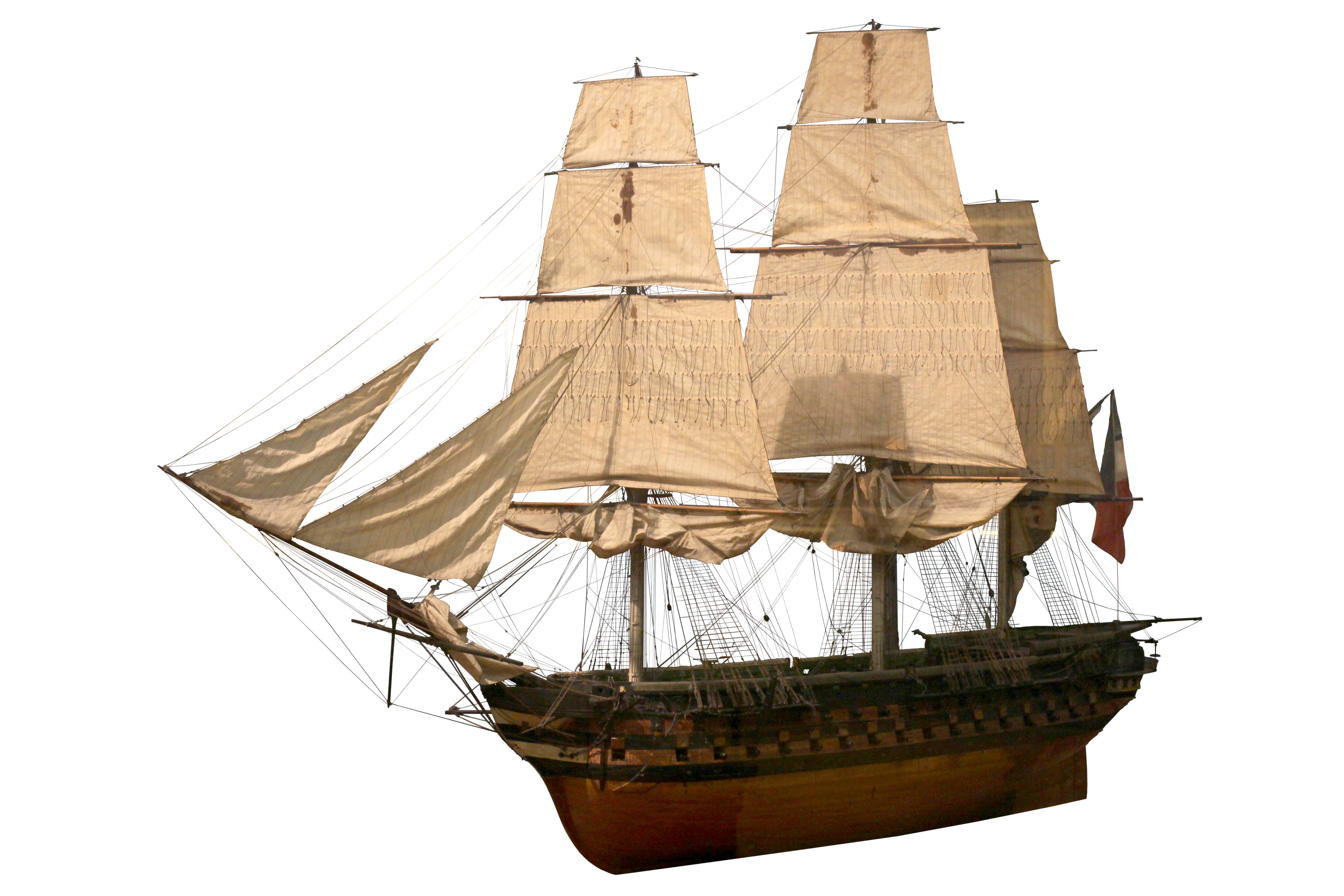
- 1/40th-scale model of the 100-gun Hercule on display at the Musée national de la Marine.

History

France
- Namesake: Hercules
- Builder: Toulon shipyard.
- Laid down: 1825
- Launched: 1836
- Stricken: 1860
- Fate: Scrapped 1882

General characteristics
- Class & type: Hercule class
- Displacement: 4440 tonnes
- Length: 62.50
- Beam: 16.20
- Draught: 8.23
- Sail plan: 3150 m^{2} of sails
- Complement: 955 men
- Armament: 100 guns, including: 32 × 30-pounder long guns (lower deck); 30 × 30-pounder short guns (upper deck); 30 30-pounder carronades (open deck); 4 × 18-pounder long guns (open deck)
- Armour: timber

Hercule was a late 100-gun ship of the line of the French Navy and the lead ship of her class. She was launched in 1836, took part in the French campaigns in Algeria and was struck from the navy in 1860. She continued to give service as a hulk, and was broken up in 1882.

== Service history ==
Commanded by Joseph Grégoire Casy, in October 1837 Hercule provided a landing party, including François d'Orléans, Prince of Joinville, third son of the French monarch, to assist in the French campaign to take the city of Constantine from Ahmed Bey ben Mohamed Chérif, but they arrived 4 days after the city had fallen. A 10-month cruise to West Africa, South America, the Caribbean and the United States followed, with the ship returning to Brest on 11 July 1838.

From 1839, she was appointed to the Mediterranean squadron, under Captain Fauré. In 1842, she was transferred to the Middle East. In October 1850, she was sent to Brest for a refit. Her armament was updated to include Paixhans guns.

In 1860, she was struck from the lists of the navy. From this point on, she was used as a support ship. She was used as a prison hulk from 1875 in Brest, and broken up in 1882.
