= French ship Jemmapes (1840) =

Ship of the line of the French Navy

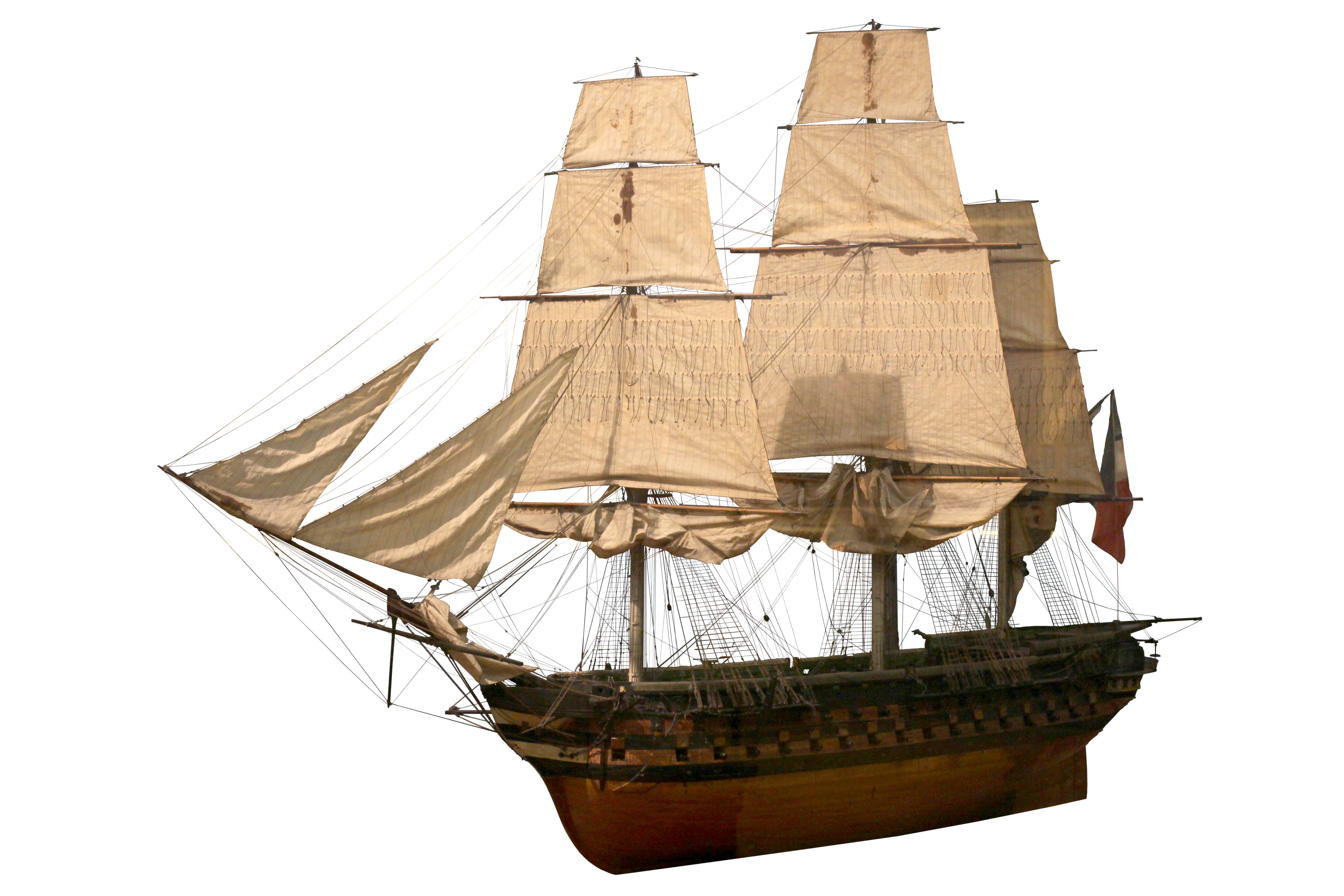
- 1/40th-scale model of the 100-gun Hercule, lead ship of Jemmapes ' class, on display at the Musée national de la Marine.

History

France
- Name: Jemmapes
- Namesake: Battle of Jemmapes
- Builder: Lorient
- Laid down: 26 April 1825
- Launched: 2 April 1836
- In service: 1840
- Stricken: 1889
- Fate: Scrapped 1890

General characteristics
- Class & type: Hercule class
- Displacement: 4440 tonnes
- Length: 62.50
- Beam: 16.20
- Draught: 8.23
- Sail plan: 3150 m² of sails
- Complement: 955 men
- Armament: 100 guns, including: 32 × 30-pounder long guns (lower deck); 30 × 30-pounder short guns (upper deck); 30 30-pounder carronades (open deck); 4 × 18-pounder long guns (open deck)
- Armour: timber

Jemmapes was a late 100-gun Hercule-class ship of the line of the French Navy.

== Service history ==
Ordered in 1824 as Indomptable and soon renamed Royal Charles, Jemmapes was laid down in 1825 but not completed before 1840. She took her definitive name after the July Revolution, on 9 August 1830.

In 1844, Jemmapes took part in the Bombardment of Mogador in Joinville's squadron. In October or November 1848, she was driven ashore at Civitavecchia, Papal States. Deactivated in 1851, she took part in the Crimean War, first in the Baltic Sea in 1854, and in the Black Sea the next year.

Decommissioned in 1864, Jemmapes was first used as a transport, and then hulked, before being scrapped in 1890.
