= Russian ship of the line Oryol (1854) =

History

Russian Empire
- Name: Oryol
- Namesake: Eagle
- Builder: New Admiralty Shipyard, St. Petersburg
- Laid down: 14 June 1851 (Note: All dates used in this article are Old Style)
- Launched: 12 August 1854
- In service: 1856
- Stricken: 7 December 1863

General characteristics
- Type: 84-gun steam-powered ship of the line
- Displacement: 3,713 long tons (3,773 t)
- Tons burthen: 2,386 bm
- Length: 202 ft 8 in (61.8 m) (p/p)
- Beam: 51 ft 6 in (15.7 m)
- Draft: 23 ft 6 in (7.2 m)
- Installed power: 450 nominal horsepower
- Propulsion: 1 shaft; 1 Baird steam engine
- Speed: 9.5 knots (17.6 km/h; 10.9 mph)
- Armament: 30 × 68-pounder smoothbore guns; 4 × 60-pounder licornes; 8 × long 24-pounder guns; 28 × short 24-pounder guns; 16 × 24-pounder carronades

Oryol (Russian: Орёл) was a wooden-hulled, steam-powered, 84-gun third-rate ship of the line built for the Imperial Russian Navy in the 1850s. She was begun as a sailing ship, but was converted to steam power while under construction. The ship served with the Baltic Fleet until she was stricken from the Navy List in 1863.

== Description, construction and career ==
Oryol was 202 feet 8 inches (61.8 m) long between perpendiculars, with a beam of 51 feet 6 inches (15.7 m) and a maximum draft of 23 feet 6 inches (7.2 m). The ship displaced 3,713 long tons (3,773 t) and measured 2,386 tons bm. She was equipped with a Russian-built Baird steam engine of 450 nominal horsepower that drove a single propeller shaft.

All of Oryol's guns were smoothbores and they consisted of two 68-pounder guns on pivot mounts as chase guns on the forecastle and quarterdeck as well as four short 24-pounder guns and sixteen 24-pounder carronades. On her upper deck the ship carried four long 24-pounders, 24 short 24-pounder guns and four 60-pounder licornes. The armament of her lower deck consisted of twenty-eight 68-pounders and four long 24-pounder guns.

The ship was laid down on 14 June 1851 at the New Admiralty Shipyard in St. Petersburg as a Prokhor-class ship of the line, but was lengthened and fitted with a steam engine while still on the stocks. Oryol was launched on 12 August 1854 made her first cruise with the Baltic Fleet in 1856. She was placed in reserve until 1859–60 when she next cruised the Baltic Sea. The ship was afterwards placed in reserve again until she was stricken on 7 December 1863.
