= William Watkins Ltd =

William Watkins Ltd one of the first tugboat owning companies in the world, was founded by John Rogers Watkins in 1833.

Already during the companies' early years their paddle tugboats, often sail-assisted, were seen in ports all over the world.

The most well known of the tows that William Watkins undertook was that of Cleopatra's Needle, from Ferrol, Spain to London by the paddle tug Anglia in 1878.

Between 1833 and 1918 Watkins had vessels taken up for Government service in both the Crimean War and WWI, and again during WW2 many of Watkins tugs were requisitioned by the Government.
