= French ship Duguay-Trouin (1854) =

Ship of the line of the French Navy

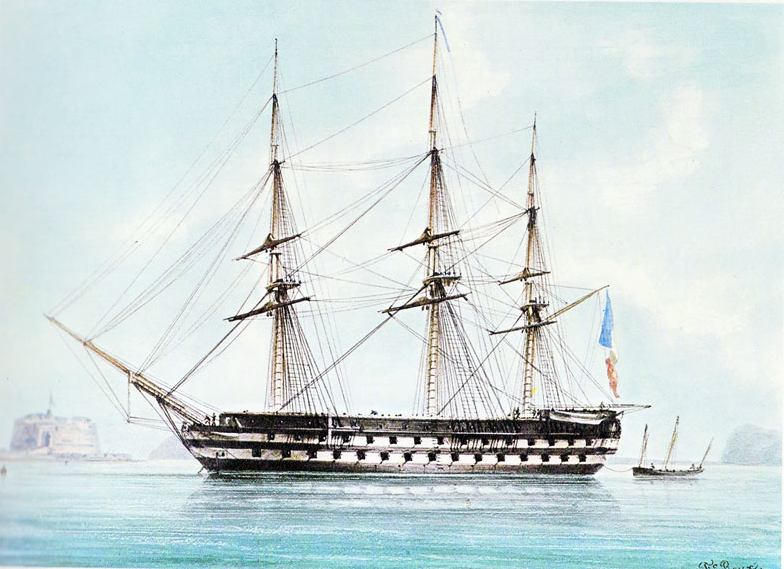
- Watercolour portrait of Duguay-Trouin, by François Roux

History

France
- Name: Duguay-Trouin
- Namesake: René Duguay-Trouin
- Builder: Lorient
- Laid down: 17 September 1827
- Launched: 29 March 1854
- Stricken: 22 July 1872
- Fate: Scrapped 1877

General characteristics
- Class & type: Hercule class
- Displacement: 4440 tonnes
- Length: 62.50 metres
- Beam: 16.20 metres
- Draught: 8.23 metres
- Sail plan: 3150 m² of sails
- Complement: 955 men
- Armament: 100 guns, including: 32 × 30-pounder long guns (lower deck); 30 × 30-pounder short guns (upper deck); 30 30-pounder carronades (open deck); 4 × 18-pounder long guns (open deck)
- Armour: timber

Duguay-Trouin was a late 100-gun Hercule-class ship of the line of the French Navy, transformed into a Sail and Steam ship.

== Service history ==
Started in 1827 as a 100-gun sailing ship, Duguay-Trouin, still unfinished, was transformed on keel from 1856. In 1860 she sailed to New Caledonia and became the first steam ship to cross Cape Horn.

From 1863, she was decommissioned and served as hospital from 1867 before becoming a prison hulk for prisoners of the Paris Commune. She was renamed Vétéran in the 1870s, and was broken up around 1877.
