= French ship Tage (1847) =

Ship of the line of the French Navy

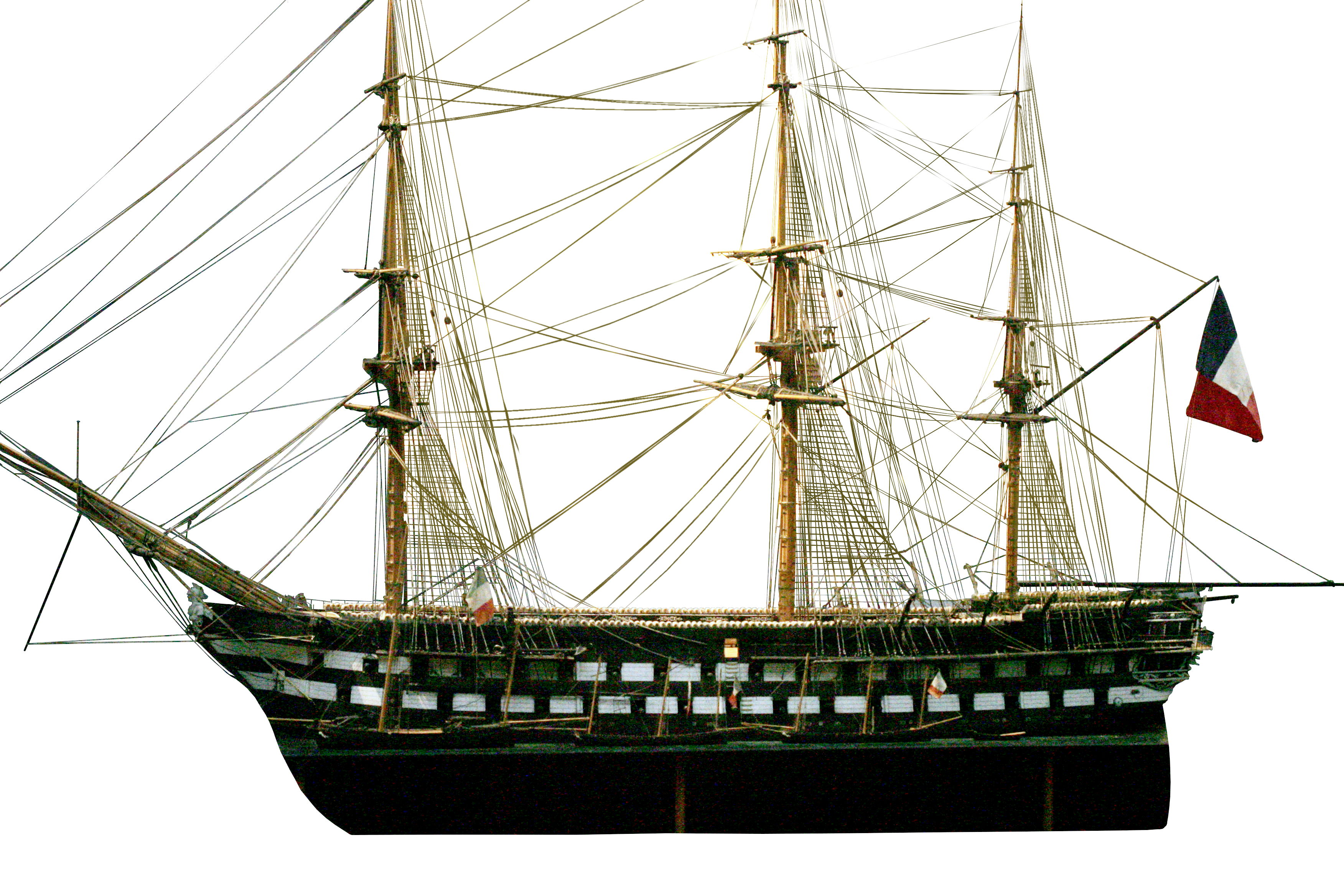
- Scale model on display at the Musée National de la Marine in Paris

History

France
- Name: Tage
- Namesake: Battle of the Tagus
- Builder: Brest shipyard
- Laid down: 26 August 1824
- Launched: 15 August 1847
- Stricken: 6 May 1884
- Fate: Scrapped 1896

General characteristics
- Class & type: Hercule-class ship of the line
- Displacement: 4,331 tonnes
- Length: 65.02 m (213 ft 4 in)
- Beam: 16.82 m (55 ft 2 in)
- Draught: 7.55 m (24 ft 9 in)
- Propulsion: Sail, 2,668 m^{2} (28,720 sq ft); Napier steam engine, 370 kW (500 shp)
- Speed: 10.7 knots (19.8 km/h; 12.3 mph)
- Capacity: 170 tonnes of coal
- Complement: 883 men
- Armament: 1858; Lower deck:16 × 36-pounders + 16 × 22 cm Paixhans guns; Middle deck:32 30-pounders; Upper deck: 14 × 16cm Paixhans guns + 6 × 30-pounder carronades; 1881; Decks: 4 × 14 cm guns + 1 × 12 cm gun; Forecastle: 4 × 12 cm guns
- Armour: Timber

The Tage ("Tagus") was a 100-gun Hercule-class ship of the line of the French Navy.

== Service history ==
She was laid down as Polyphème in 1824, renamed Saint Louis, and eventually named Tage. She was launched in 1847. On the 12 February 1855, she ran aground in Kamiesch, Crimea. She was eventually refloated. From 1857 to 1858, she was converted to steam ship.

After 1871, she was used as a prison ship to hold insurgents of the Commune of Paris. Later she ferried prisoners to New Caledonia.

She served as a hulk before being scrapped in 1896.
