= Louis Le Breton =

French painter (1818–1866)

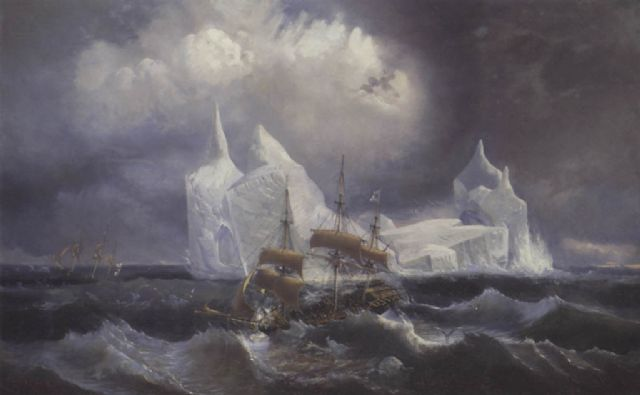
French ships Astrolabe and Zélée, by Le Breton

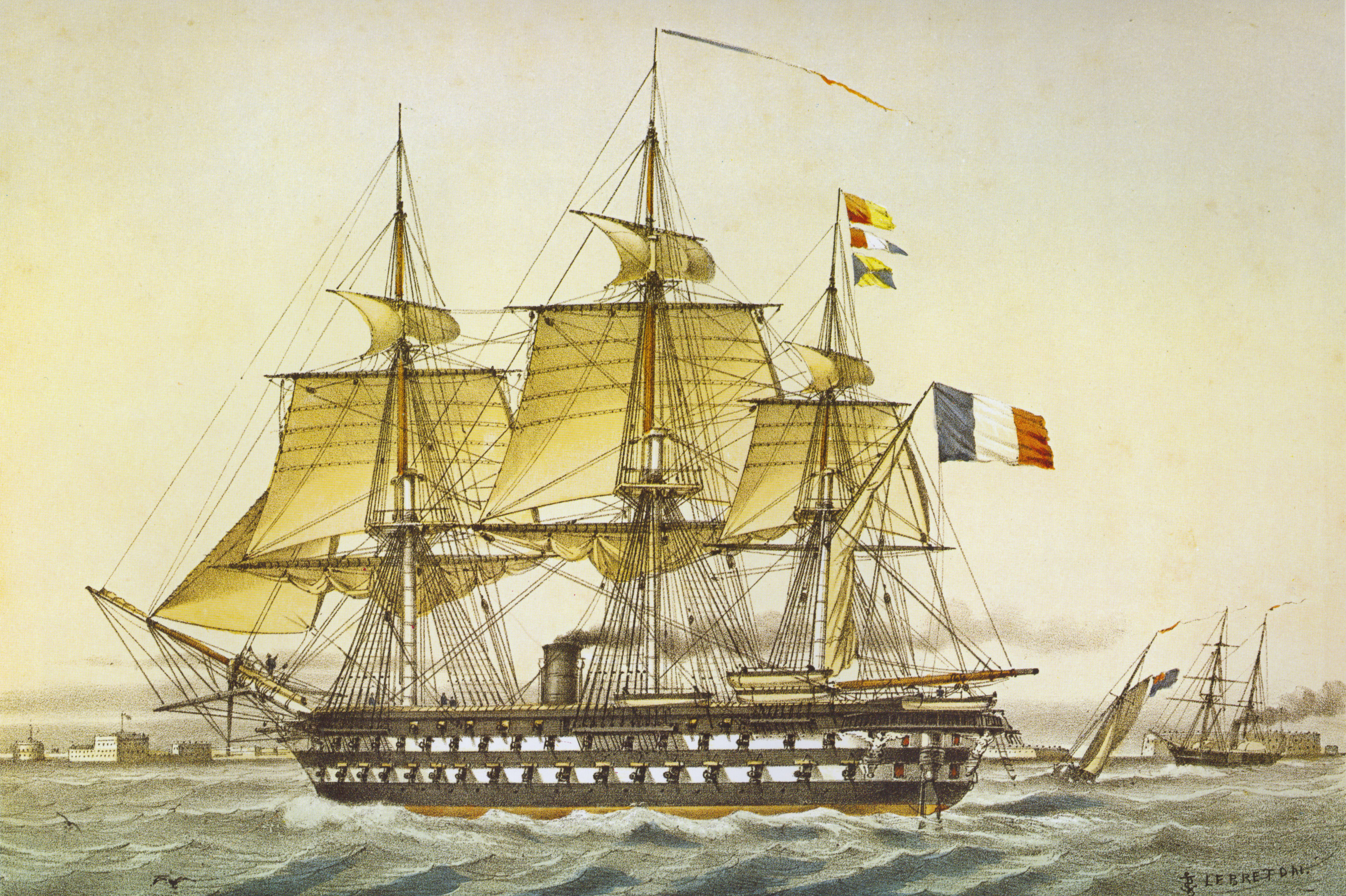
Austerlitz

Louis Le Breton (15 January 1818 – 30 August 1866) was a French painter who specialised in marine art.

Le Breton studied medicine and took part in Dumont d'Urville's second voyage aboard the Astrolabe. After the official illustrator of the expedition died, Le Breton replaced him.

From 1847, Le Breton devoted himself mainly to depicting marine subjects for the French Navy.

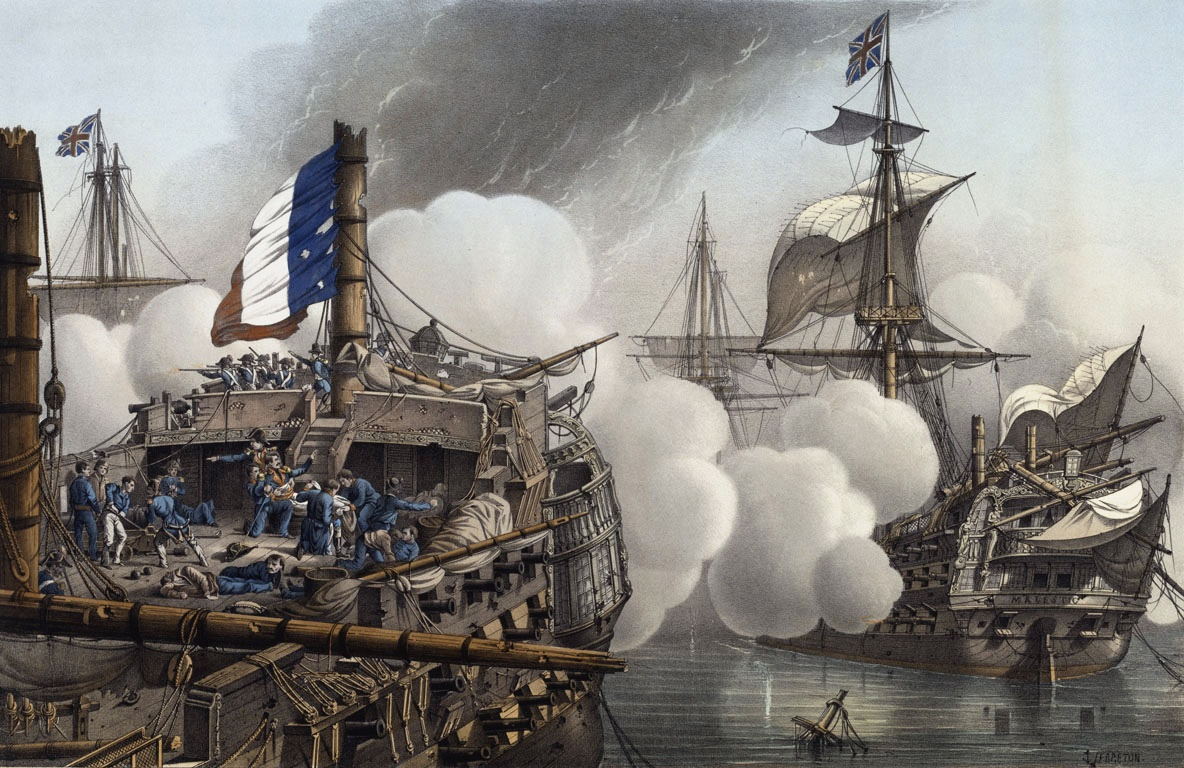
Le Breton's illustration of HMS Majestic engaging HMS Tonnant at the Battle of the Nile

== Occult ==
Louis Le Breton executed 69 illustrations of occult demons, for the 1863 edition of Dictionnaire Infernal by Collin de Plancy.

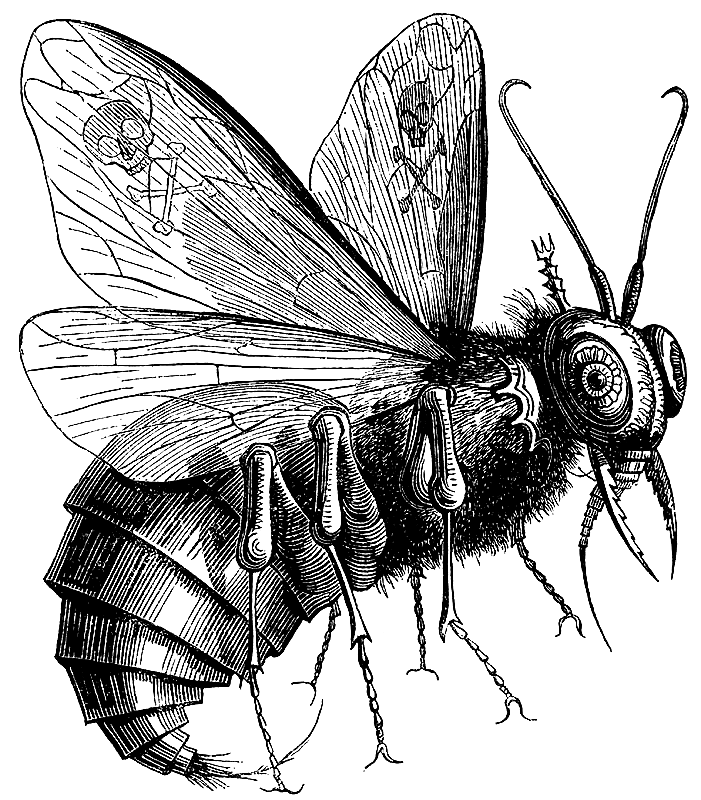
An illustration by Le Breton from Dictionnaire Infernal

== See also ==
- European and American voyages of scientific exploration
