= French ship Wagram (1854) =

Ship of the line of the French Navy

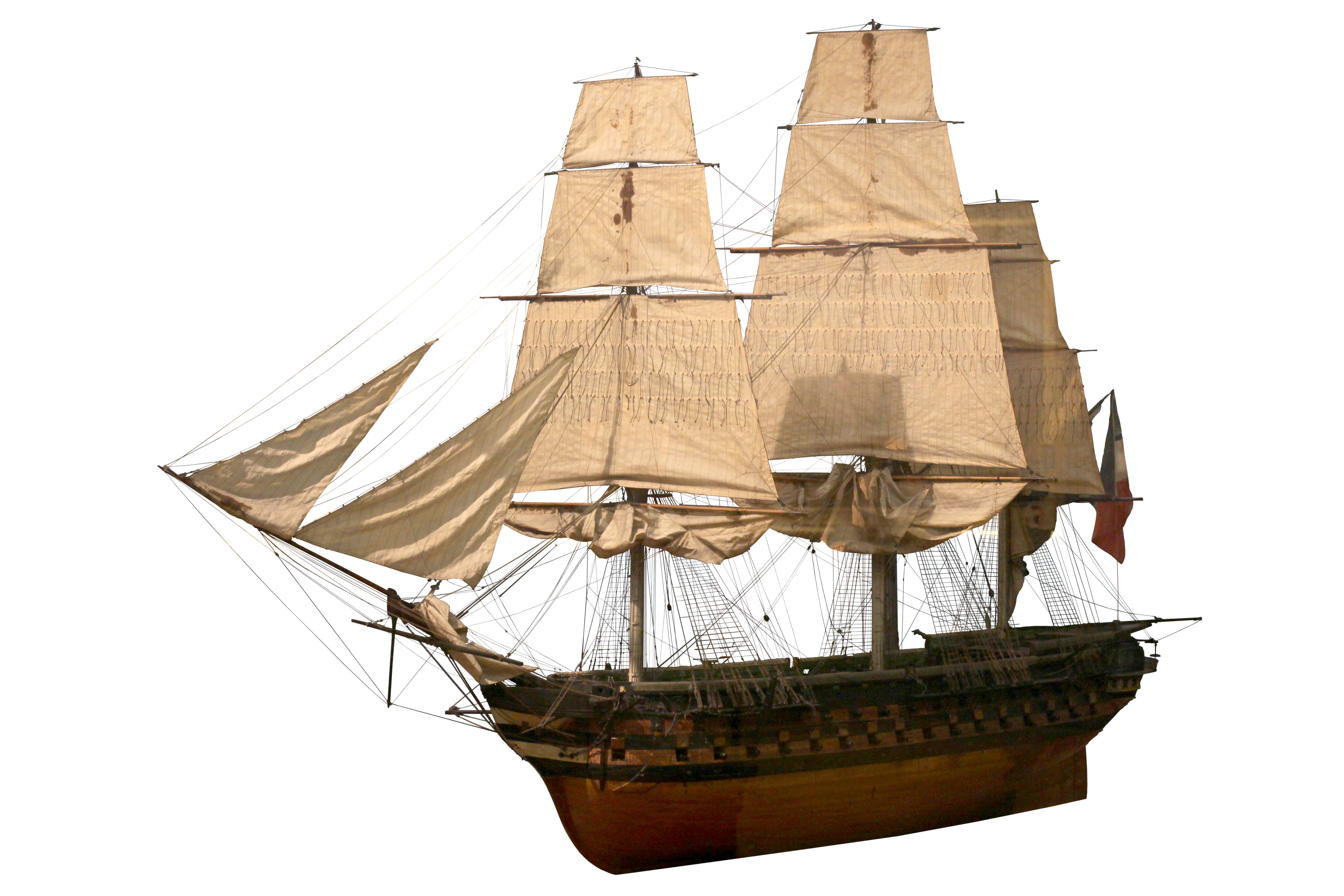
- 1/40th-scale model of the 100-gun Hercule, lead ship of Wagram 's class, on display at the Musée national de la Marine.

History

France
- Name: Wagram
- Namesake: Battle of Wagram
- Builder: Lorient
- Laid down: 22 August 1833
- Launched: 12 June 1854
- Stricken: 1867
- Fate: Sunk as Target April 29, 1867

General characteristics
- Class & type: Hercule class
- Displacement: 4440 tonnes
- Length: 62.50
- Beam: 16.20
- Draught: 8.23
- Sail plan: 3150 m² of sails
- Complement: 955 men
- Armament: 100 guns, including: 32 × 30-pounder long guns (lower deck); 30 × 30-pounder short guns (upper deck); 30 30-pounder carronades (open deck); 4 × 18-pounder long guns (open deck)
- Armour: timber

Wagram was a late 100-gun Hercule-class ship of the line of the French Navy, transformed into a Sail and Steam ship.

== Service history ==
Started as Bucentaure, Wagram took part in the Crimean War and in the Battle of Kinburn. In 1862, she served in the French intervention in Mexico.

On 29 April 1867, she was sunk as a target for torpedo trials.
