= French ship Turenne (1854) =

Ship of the line of the French Navy

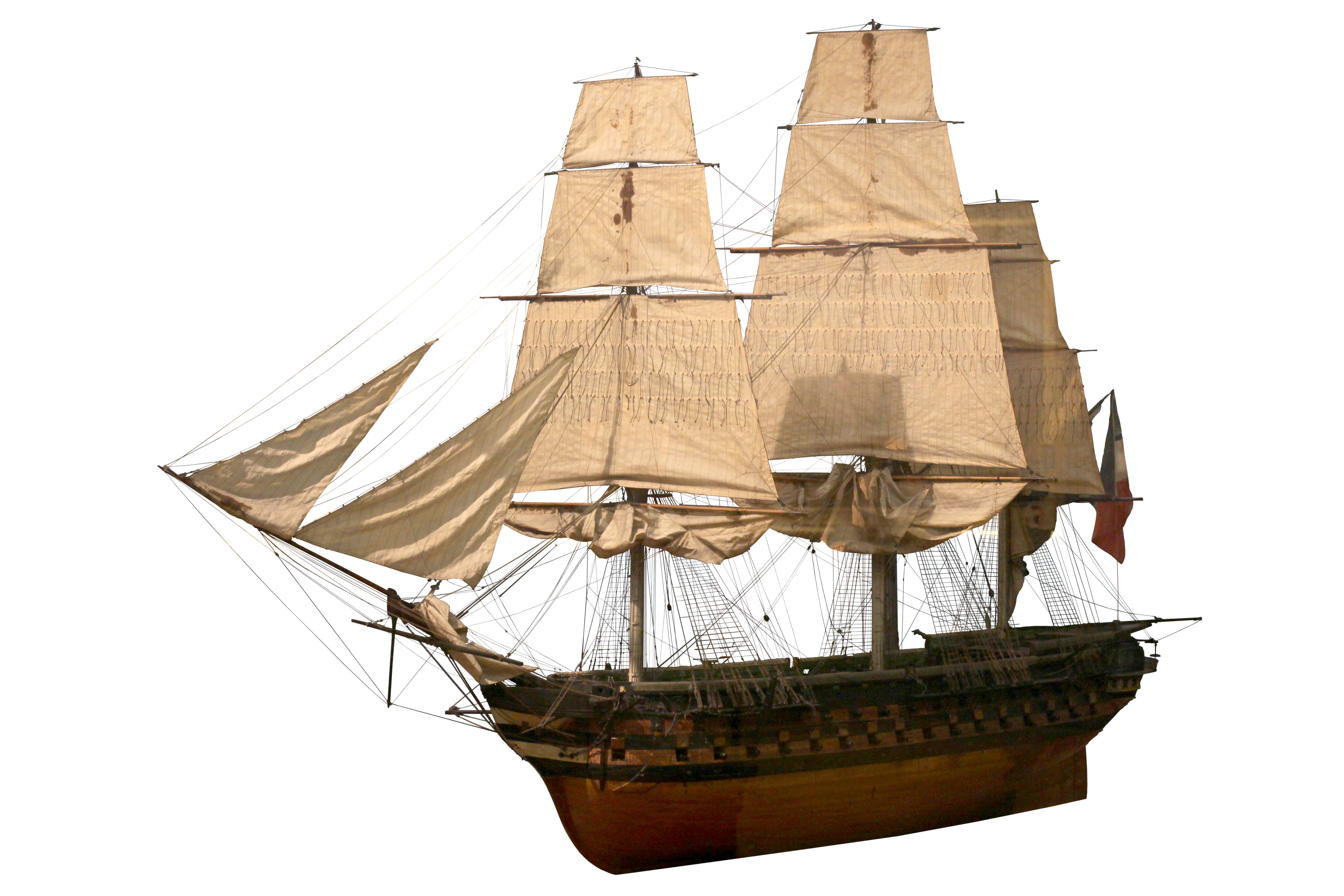
- 1/40th-scale model of the 100-gun Hercule, lead ship of Turenne 's class, on display at the Musée national de la Marine.

History

France
- Name: Turenne
- Namesake: Henri de la Tour d'Auvergne, Vicomte de Turenne
- Builder: Rochefort
- Laid down: 13 June 1827
- Launched: 15 April 1854
- Stricken: 25 November 1867
- Fate: Scrapped 1887

General characteristics
- Class & type: Hercule class
- Displacement: 4440 tonnes
- Length: 62.50
- Beam: 16.20
- Draught: 8.23
- Sail plan: 3150 m^{2} of sails
- Complement: 955 men
- Armament: 100 guns, including: 32 × 30-pounder long guns (lower deck); 30 × 30-pounder short guns (upper deck); 30 30-pounder carronades (open deck); 4 × 18-pounder long guns (open deck)
- Armour: timber

Turenne was a late 100-gun Hercule-class ship of the line of the French Navy, transformed into a Sail and Steam ship.

== Service history ==
Soon after her commissioning, Turenne was used as a troopship in the Crimean War. Transformed into a steam and sail ship in 1858 and 1859, she conducted trials in 1860 and served during the French intervention in Mexico.

Put in ordinary from 1862, she was decommissioned in 1867 and used as a coaling hulk in Brest from 1869. She was eventually broken up around 1887.
