= French ship Navarin (1854) =

Ship of the line of the French Navy

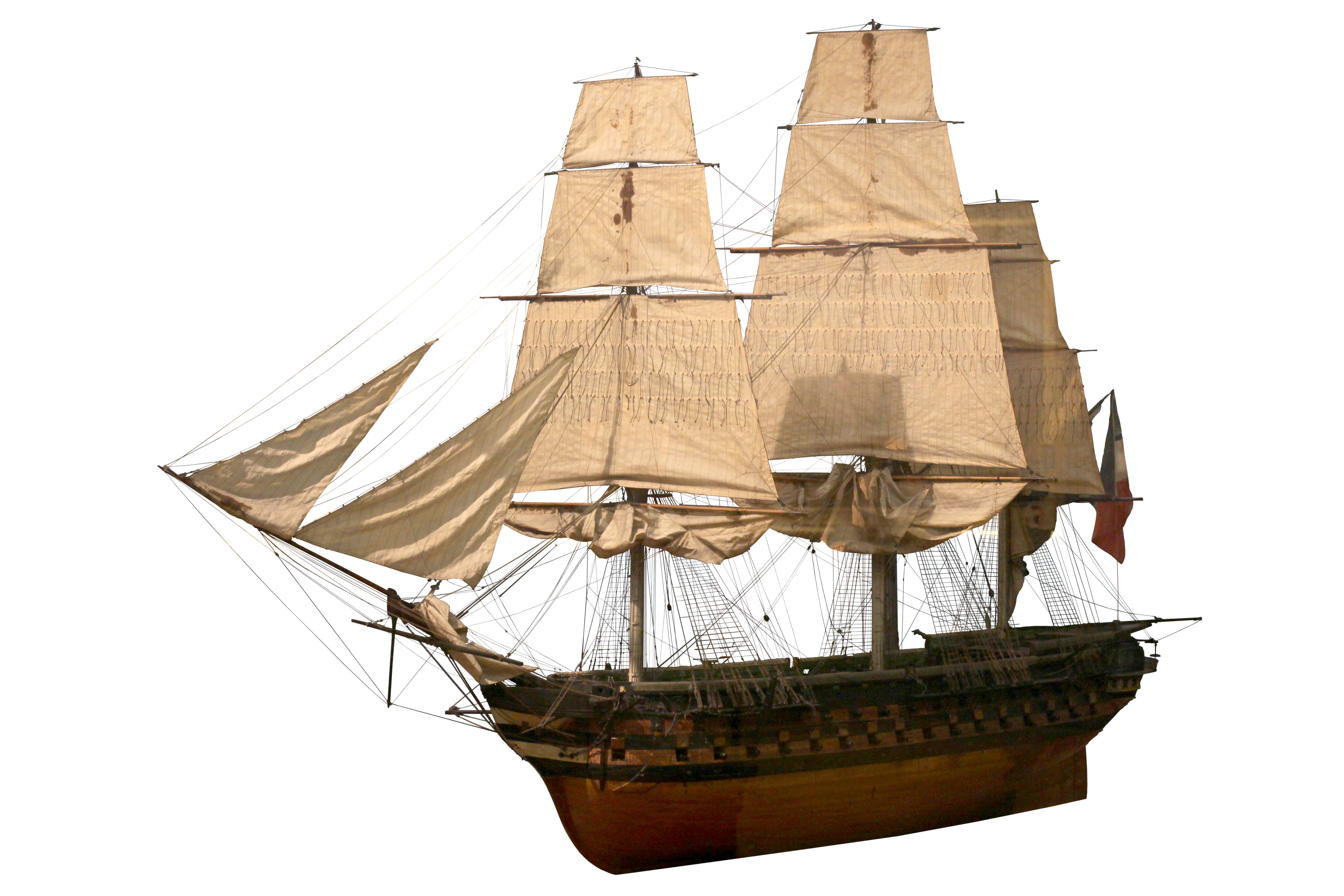
- 1/40th-scale model of the 100-gun Hercule, lead ship of Navarin 's class, on display at the Musée national de la Marine.

History

France
- Name: Navarin
- Namesake: Battle of Navarino
- Builder: Toulon
- Laid down: May 1832
- Launched: 26 July 1854
- Stricken: 13 July 1886
- Fate: Scrapped 1908

General characteristics
- Class & type: Hercule class
- Displacement: 4440 tonnes
- Length: 62.50
- Beam: 16.20
- Draught: 8.23
- Sail plan: 3150 m² of sails
- Complement: 955 men
- Armament: 100 guns, including: 32 × 30-pounder long guns (lower deck); 30 × 30-pounder short guns (upper deck); 30 30-pounder carronades (open deck); 4 × 18-pounder long guns (open deck)
- Armour: timber

Navarin was a late 100-gun Hercule-class ship of the line of the French Navy, transformed into a Sail and Steam ship.

== Service history ==
Navarin was used as a troopship in the Crimean War before becoming a schoolship in 1862. In 1873, her engine was removed and she became a sailing transport for prisoners sent in deportation in New Caledonia.

She became a hulk in Brest in 1887 and was eventually broken up in 1908.
