= French ship Ulm (1854) =

Ship of the line of the French Navy

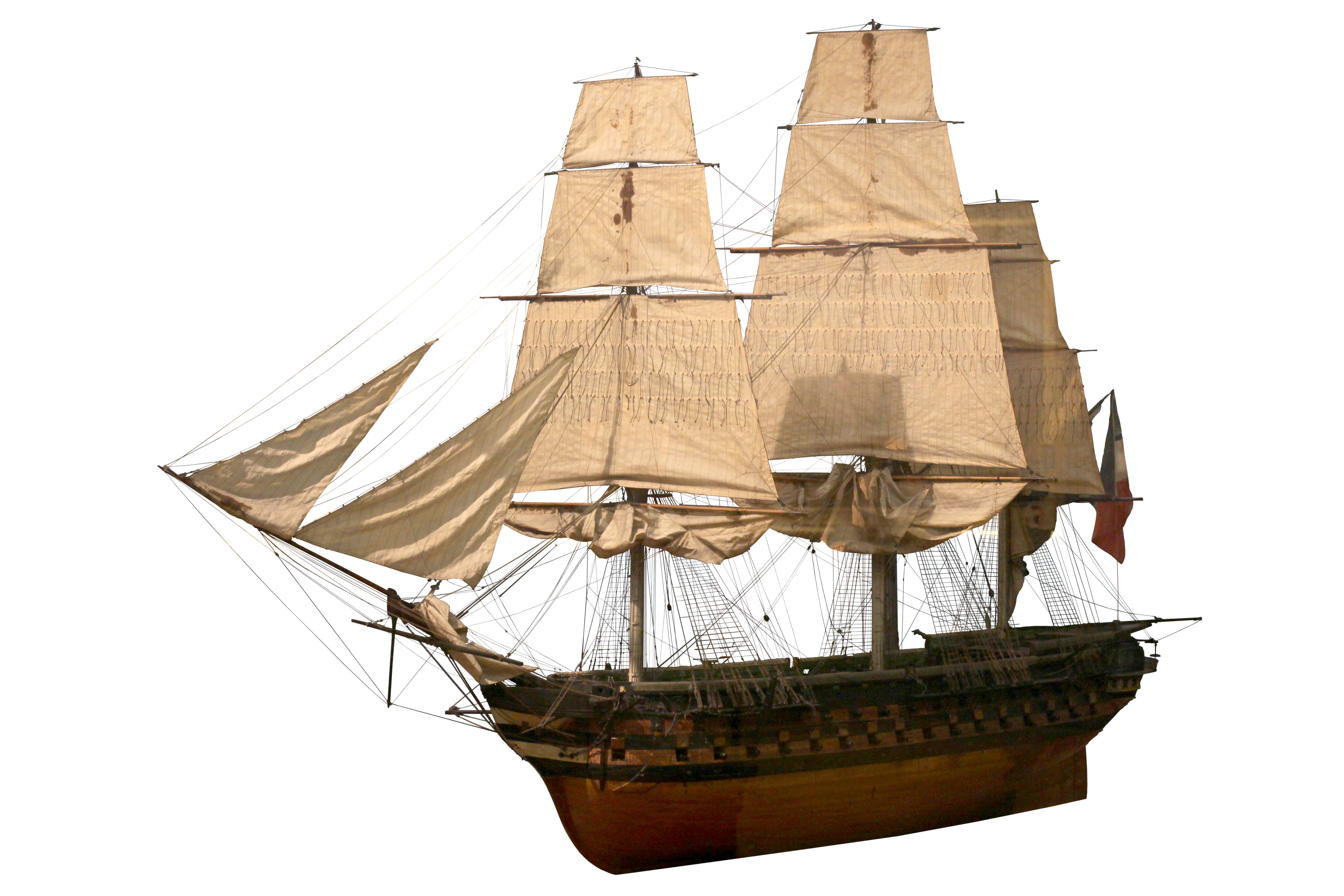
- 1/40th-scale model of the 100-gun Hercule, lead ship of Ulm ' class, on display at the Musée national de la Marine.

History

France
- Name: Ulm
- Namesake: Battle of Ulm
- Builder: Rochefort
- Laid down: 13 July 1825
- Launched: 13 May 1854
- Stricken: 25 November 1867
- Fate: Scrapped 1890

General characteristics
- Class & type: Hercule class
- Displacement: 4,440 tonnes
- Length: 62.50
- Beam: 16.20
- Draught: 8.23
- Sail plan: 3,150 m^{2} of sails
- Complement: 955 men
- Armament: 100 guns, including: 32 × 30-pounder long guns (lower deck); 30 × 30-pounder short guns (upper deck); 30 30-pounder carronades (open deck); 4 × 18-pounder long guns (open deck)
- Armour: timber

Ulm was a 100-gun Hercule-class ship of the line of the French Navy. She was transformed into a steam and sail ship while on keel and launched as an 82-gun ship.

== Service history ==
Ordered as Lys under the absolute monarchy of Charles X, the ship, still under construction, was renamed Ulm on 9 August 1830, following the July Revolution. She was transformed into a sail and steam ship, receiving an Indret engine, and was eventually launched in 1854.

She served in the Black Sea during the Crimean War and took part in the Battle of Kinburn. From July 1857, she was part of the squadron of Toulon. She transferred to Brest in 1860 for engine trials, and to Cherbourg in June 1862.

From September 1862, she served in the French intervention in Mexico. She returned to Brest on 3 January 1863.

Struck in 1867, she was used as a coaling hulk in Brest before being eventually broken up in 1890.
