= USS Mobile (1862) =

Gunboat of the United States Navy

History

United States
- Launched: 1854
- Commissioned: 8 May 1862
- Decommissioned: 1865
- Captured: by Union Navy forces; 25 April 1862
- Fate: Sold, 30 March 1865; Sank, 25 October 1865

General characteristics
- Displacement: 1,275 tons
- Length: 210 ft (64 m)
- Beam: 33 ft (10 m)
- Draft: 16 ft 6 in (5.03 m)
- Propulsion: steam engine; side wheel-propelled
- Armament: two 32-pounder guns; one 30-pounder Parrott rifle; one 12-pounder gun

USS Mobile was a steamer captured by the Union Navy during the American Civil War. She was used by the Union Navy as part of blockade forces to prevent Confederate forces from trading with other countries.

== Service history ==
Mobile, a side wheel steamer built as Tennessee at Baltimore, Maryland, in 1854 for Charles Morgan's Texas Line, was seized by Maj. Gen. M. Lovell, CSA, at New Orleans, Louisiana, 15 January 1862, and put into service as a Confederate government operated blockade runner; captured by U.S. forces at New Orleans 25 April 1862; and commissioned as Tennessee 8 May 1862, Acting Master John D. Childs in command. Assigned to the West Gulf Blockading Squadron, she took part in the capture of Port Hudson, Louisiana, 9 July 1863, and of Fort Morgan, and Fort Gaines in August 1864. Able to vie in speed with the faster blockade runners, she captured or assisted in the capture of seven Confederate vessels: Alabama, Friendship, and Jane in 1863, and Allison, Annie Verden, Louisia, and Emily in 1864. Her speed also brought numerous assignments as a dispatch boat for the squadron, taking her from Pensacola, Florida, to gulf coast points as far away as the mouth of the Rio Grande.

On 1 September 1864, following the capture of ironclad CSS Tennessee and her commissioning as a ship of the U.S. Navy, the side wheeler steamer was renamed Mobile. Heavily damaged soon after in a gale off the Rio Grande, Mobile was sent to New York City for repairs. She was sold to Russell Sturgis 30 March 1865. Redocumented as Republic 12 May 1865, she foundered at sea off Savannah, Georgia, 25 October 1865.

== See also ==
- Blockade runners of the American Civil War
- Blockade mail of the Confederacy
