= Hercule-class ship of the line =

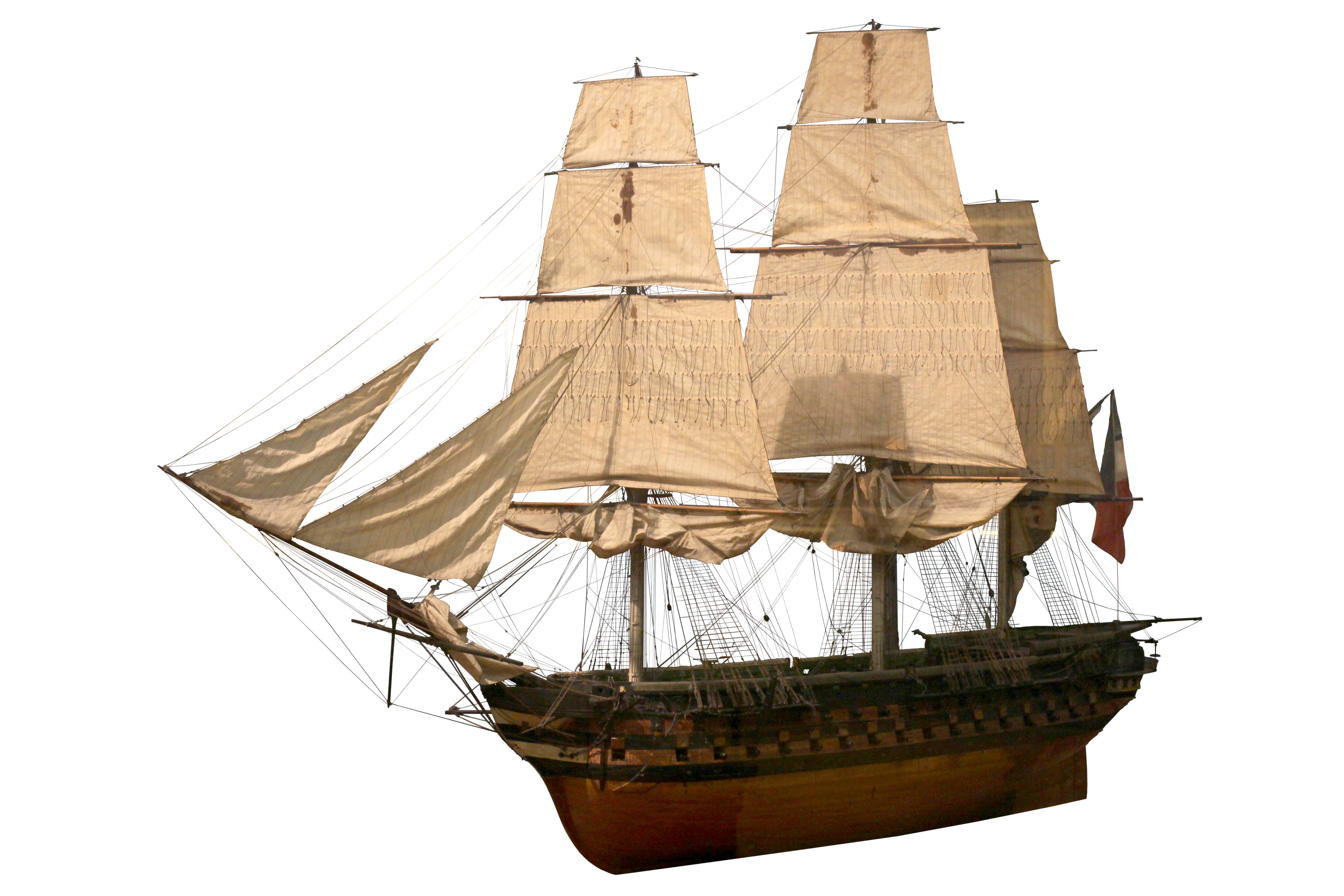
- 1/40th-scale model of the 100-gun Hercule on display at the Musée national de la Marine.

Class overview
- Name: Hercule
- Builders: Toulon, Brest
- Operators: French Navy
- Preceded by: Suffren class
- Succeeded by: Napoléon class; Algésiras class
- Completed: 13
- Canceled: 2

General characteristics
- Class & type: Hercule class
- Displacement: 4440 tonnes
- Length: 62.50 m (205 ft 1 in)
- Beam: 16.20 m (53 ft 2 in)
- Draught: 8.23 m (27 ft 0 in)
- Propulsion: 3,150 m^{2} (33,900 sq ft) of sails
- Complement: 955 men
- Armament: 100 guns, including: 32 × long 30-pounders (lower deck); 30 × short 30-pounders (middle deck); 30 × 30-pounder carronades (upper deck); 4 × long 18-pounders (upper deck)
- Armour: Timber

The Hercule class was a late type of 100-gun ships of the line of the French Navy. They were the second strongest of four ranks of ships of the line designed by the Commission de Paris. While the first units were classical straight-walled ships of the line, next ones were gradually converted to steam, and the last one was built with an engine.

== Design ==
The Hercule class evolved as an enlargement of the straight-walled, 90-gun Suffren class, suggested by Jean Tupinier.

With the Henri IV, a rounded stern was introduced. The next ships were built with the rounded stern, and it was retrofitted on the early units of the class.

== Units ==
- Hercule (1836)

Builder:
Begun:
Launched:
Completed:
Fate:

- Jemmapes (1840)

Builder:
Begun:
Launched:
Completed:
Fate:

- Tage

Builder:
Begun:
Launched:
Completed:
Fate:

- Henri IV

Builder:Cherbourg
Begun:1829
Launched:1848
Completed:1850
Fate: Bombardment of Odessa (1854). Lost in a storm at Eupatoria in the Crimea (14.11.1854)

- Austerlitz

Builder:
Begun:
Launched:
Completed:
Fate:

- Fleurus

Builder:
Begun:
Launched:
Completed:
Fate:

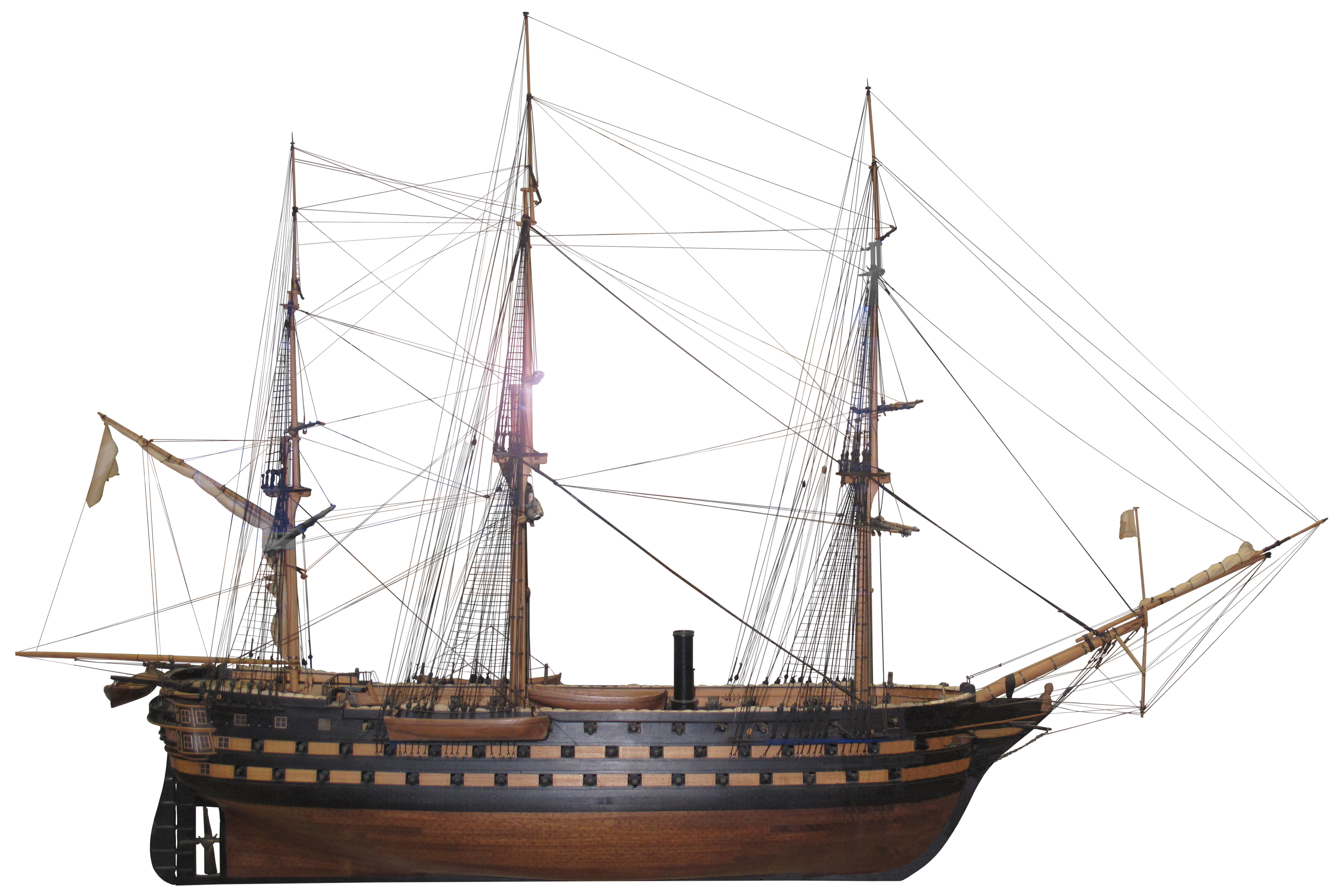
1/75th-scale model of Prince Jérôme, on display at the Swiss Museum of Transport. She was transformed into a sail and steam ship of the line while on keel.

- Annibal, renamed Prince Jérôme

Builder:
Begun:
Launched:
Completed:
Fate:

- Dugay Trouin

Builder:
Begun:
Launched:
Completed:
Fate:

- Turenne

Builder:
Begun:
Launched:
Completed:
Fate:

- Ulm, Lys renamed 1830

Builder:Rochefort
Begun:1825
Launched:
Completed:
Fate: Bombardment at Kinburn (1855)

- Wagram, Bucentaure renamed 1839

Builder:Lorient
Begun:1833
Launched:
Completed:
Fate: Bombardment at Kinburn (1855)

- Navarin

Builder:
Begun:
Launched:
Completed:
Fate:

- Eylau

Builder:
Begun:
Launched:
Completed:
Fate:

== Notes and references ==
=== Bibliography ===
- Roche, Jean-Michel (2005). Dictionnaire des bâtiments de la flotte de guerre française de Colbert à nos jours. Vol. 1. Group Retozel-Maury Millau. ISBN 978-2-9525917-0-6. OCLC 165892922.
