= French ship Duguesclin (1848) =

Ship of the line of the French Navy

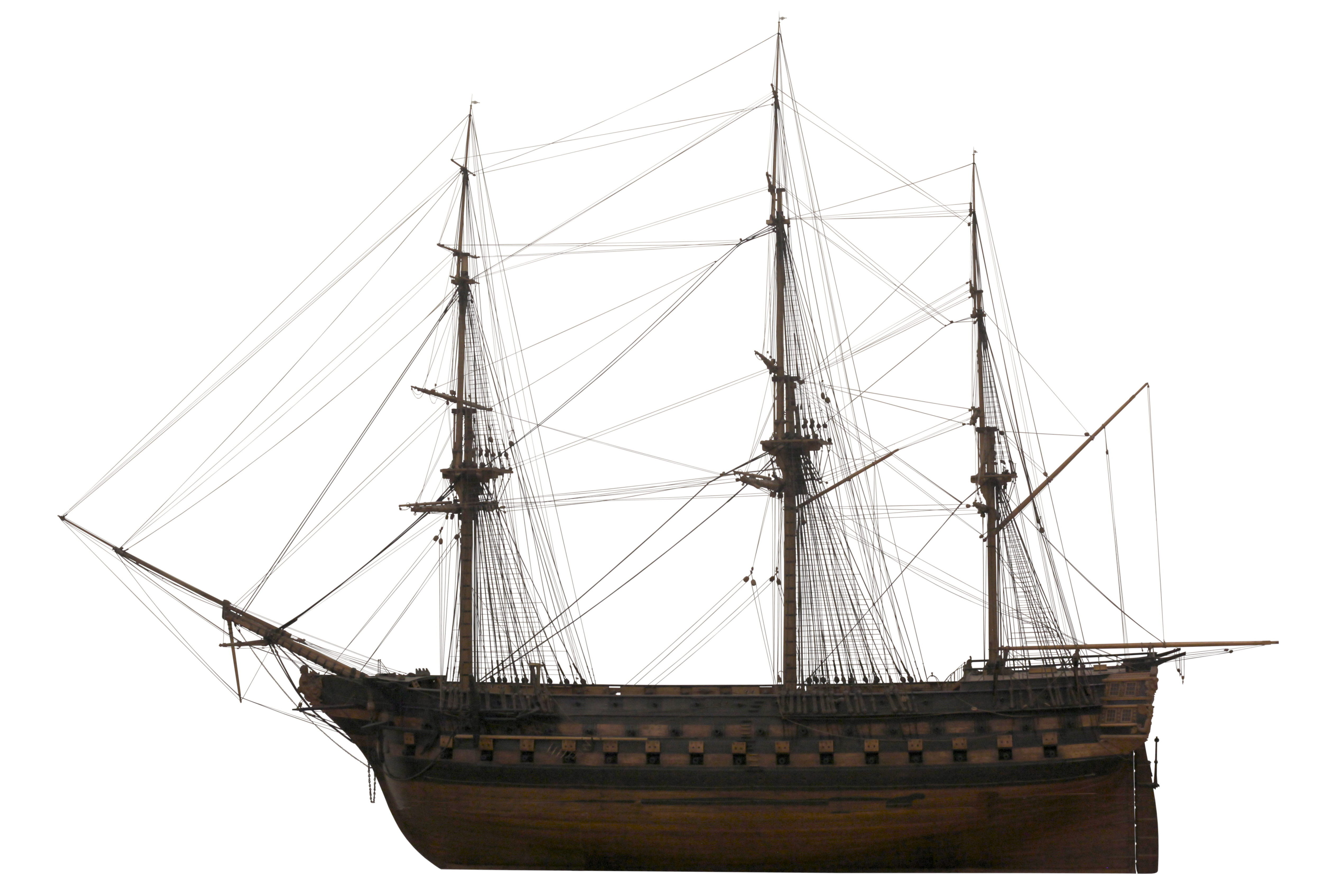
- 1/20th scale model of Suffren, lead ship of Duguesclin's class, on display at the Musée national de la Marine

History

France
- Name: Duguesclin
- Namesake: Bertrand du Guesclin
- Builder: Rochefort
- Laid down: 26 March 1823
- Launched: 3 May 1848
- Stricken: 17 December 1859
- Fate: Ran aground and lost, scrapped on site

General characteristics
- Class & type: Suffren-class ship of the line
- Displacement: 4,070 tonnes
- Length: 60.50 m (198 ft 6 in)
- Beam: 16.28 m (53 ft 5 in)
- Draught: 7.40 m (24 ft 3 in)
- Propulsion: 3,114 m^{2} (33,520 sq ft) of sails
- Complement: 810 to 846 men
- Armament: 1824–1839: 30 × 30-pounder long guns on lower deck; 32 × 30-pounder short guns on middle deck; 24 × 30-pounder carronades and 4 × 18-pounders on upper decks; 1839–1840; 26 × 30-pounder long guns and 4 × 22 cm Paixhans guns on lower deck; 32 × 30-pounder short guns on middle deck; 24 × 30-pounder carronades and 4 × 16 cm Paixhans guns on upper decks
- Armour: 6.97 cm (2.74 in) of timber

Duguesclin was a 90-gun ship of the line of the French Navy. She was the second ship in French service named in honour of Bertrand du Guesclin.

== Career ==
Duguesclin was first used as barracks for prisoners sent to deportation to Îles du Salut, and then as a transport for those sent to the Bagne of Cayenne. She then took part in the Crimean War in the Black Sea in 1854 and 1855. On 6 July 1854, Duguesclin ran aground on the Warren Rock, off Kronstadt, Russia as the buoy marking it had been removed by the Russians. Her upper and middle deck guns had to be removed before she could be refloated.

On 14 December 1859, as she conducted trials of her newly installed steam engine under Commander Choux, she ran aground on Île Longue. All efforts to raise her proved fruitless and she was scrapped. Her engine was used on Jean Bart.
