= French ship Tilsitt (1854) =

Ship of the line of the French Navy

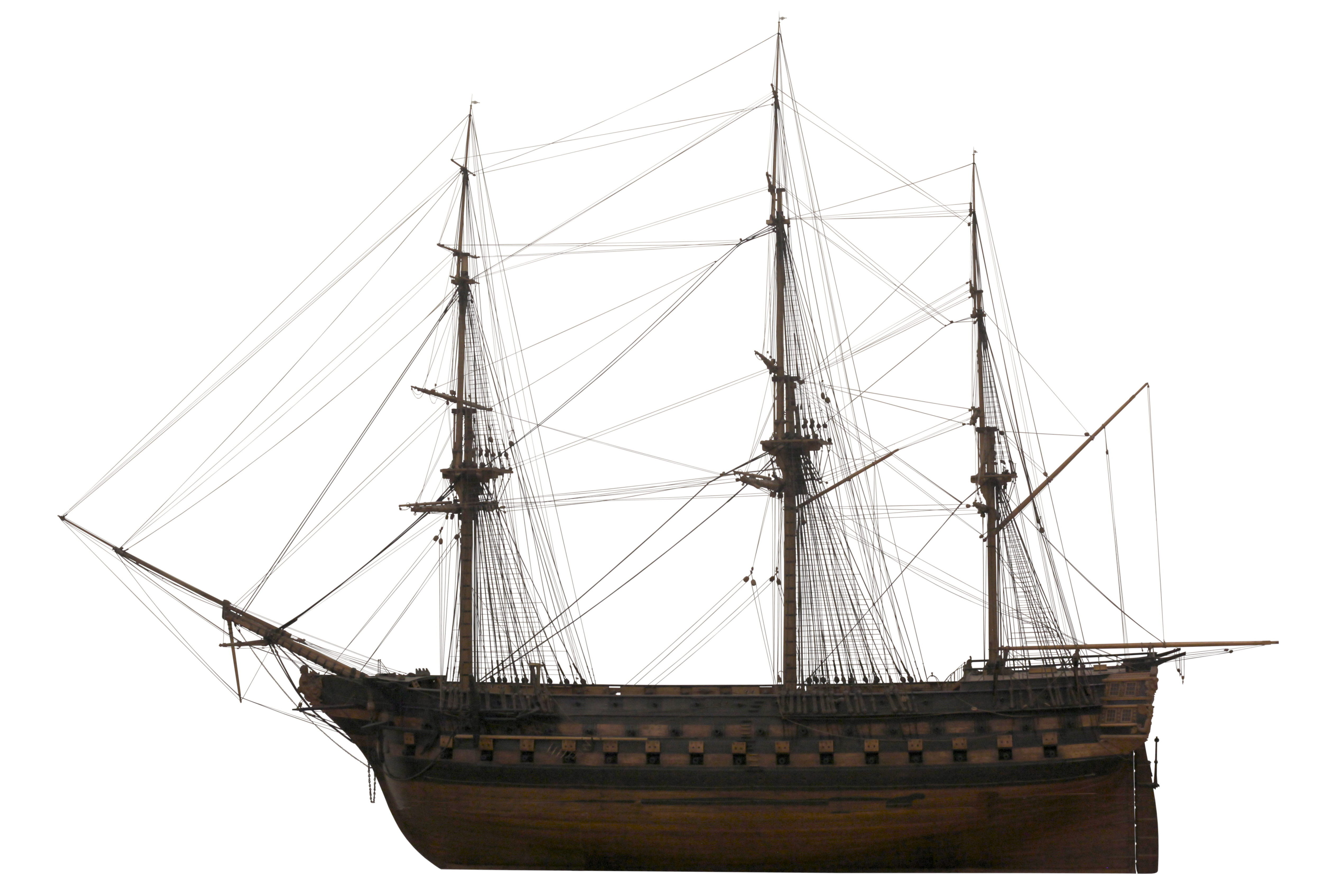
- 1/20th scale model of Suffren, lead ship of Tilsitt's class, on display at the Musée national de la Marine

History

France
- Name: Tilsitt
- Namesake: Treaties of Tilsit
- Builder: Cherbourg
- Laid down: 2 March 1832
- Launched: 30 March 1854
- Stricken: 22 July 1872
- Fate: Scrapped

General characteristics
- Class & type: Breslaw-class ship of the line
- Displacement: 4,289 tonnes
- Length: 63.54 m (208 ft 6 in) (gun deck)
- Beam: 16.28 m (53 ft 5 in)
- Draught: 8.44 m (27 ft 8 in)=
- Depth: 8.05 m (26 ft 5 in)
- Propulsion: 1 × shaft; 1 × Horizontal-return connecting rod-steam engine
- Sail plan: Full-rigged ship
- Complement: 814
- Armament: 80 muzzle-loading, smoothbore guns; Lower gun deck: 16 × 30 pdr long guns, 14 × 22 cm (8.7 in) long Paixhans guns; Upper gun deck: 30 × 30 pdr short guns; Forecastle & Quarterdeck: 2 × 16 cm (6.3 in) rifled guns, 12 × 30 pdr short guns, 6 × 30 pdr carronades

Tilsitt was a steam-powered, third-rate, 80 gun Breslaw-class ship of the line built for the French Navy during the 1850s. She had been laid down as a Suffren-class sailing ship of the line in 1832, but remained on the stocks until the ship was launched in 1854 and completed later the same year. Tilsitt played a minor role in the Crimean War of 1854–1856. The ship was chosen for conversion to steam power in 1854.

== Description ==
Tilsitt had a length of 63.54 metres (208 ft 6 in) at the gun deck a beam of 16.28 metres (53 ft 5 in) and a depth of hold of 8.05 metres (26 ft 5 in). The ship displaced 4289 tonnes and had a mean draught of 8.44 metres (27 ft 8 in). Her crew numbered 814 officers and ratings. She was powered by a horizontal-return connecting rod-steam engine that drove the single propeller shaft. The engine, built by Arsenal de Brest, was rated at 500 nominal horsepower. She was fitted with three masts and ship rigged like the 80-gun sailing ships of the line in service.

The muzzle-loading, smoothbore armament of Breslaw consisted of sixteen 36-pounder long guns and fourteen 22 cm (8.7 in) Paixhans guns on the lower gun deck. On the upper gundeck were twenty-four 30-pound short guns. On the quarterdeck and forecastle were a total of two 16 cm (6.3 in) rifled guns, a dozen 30-pounder short guns, and six 30-pounder carronades.

== Construction and career ==
Tilsitt had been laid down as a 90-gun 3rd-rank Suffren-class ship of the line on 20 August 1832 at the Arsenal de Cherbourg under the name of Diomède, but construction was suspended. The ship was renamed Tilsitt on 23 November 1839. Her incomplete hull was kept in a covered slipway until she was launched on 30 March 1854. The ship was commissioned on 20 May 1854 and completed in June. Tilsitt served as a troopship during the Crimean War.

The ship's conversion into a steam-powered ship was ordered on 19 October 1854, although work did not begin until 9 February 1856 at the Arsenal de Brest. Tilsitt was re-launched later that year, completed in October 1859 and recommissioned on 1 January 1860. She served as a troopship during the French intervention in Mexico in 1862–1863. The ship served as a prison hulk for prisoners of the Paris Commune from June 1871 to April 1872, and was struck from the navy list on 22 July. Sometime that year her engines were removed. Tilsitt was converted into a barracks ship in 1877 for service at Saigon, French Indochina, and then replaced Fleurus as the hulk serving as the headquarters of the French naval division of Indochina from 1878 to 1883. The hulk became a tender to the paddle aviso Pluvier in 1887 until she was sold the following year.
