= French ship Achille =

Nine ships of the French Navy have borne the name Achille in honour of Greek hero Achilles:

- Achille (1705), a 70-gun ship of the line
- Achille (1748), a 64-gun ship of the line
- Annibal (1778), a 74-gun ship of the line, was renamed Achille in 1786. She was taken in the Glorious First of June and recommissioned in the Royal Navy as HMS Achille before being broken up at Plymouth in 1796.
- Achille (1793), a fluyt
- Achille (1803), a 74-gun Téméraire-class ship of the line launched in 1803, which took part in the Battle of Trafalgar, where she exploded and sank.
- Achille (1806), a ferry
- Breslaw (1827), a 90-gun Suffren-class ship of the line, was started as Achille before being renamed
- Saint Louis (1848), a 90-gun Suffren-class ship of the line, was started as Achille before being renamed
- Achille (1933–1940), a Redoutable-class submarine
- Also, the 74-gun ship Illustre (1807), renamed to Dantzig in 1807, and to Achille in 1815.

== See also ==
- HMS Achille

== Bibliography ==
- Roche, Jean-Michel (2005). Dictionnaire des bâtiments de la flotte de guerre française de Colbert à nos jours. Vol. 1. Group Retozel-Maury Millau. p. 19. ISBN 978-2-9525917-0-6. OCLC 165892922.
