= French ship Bayard (1847) =

Ship of the line of the French Navy

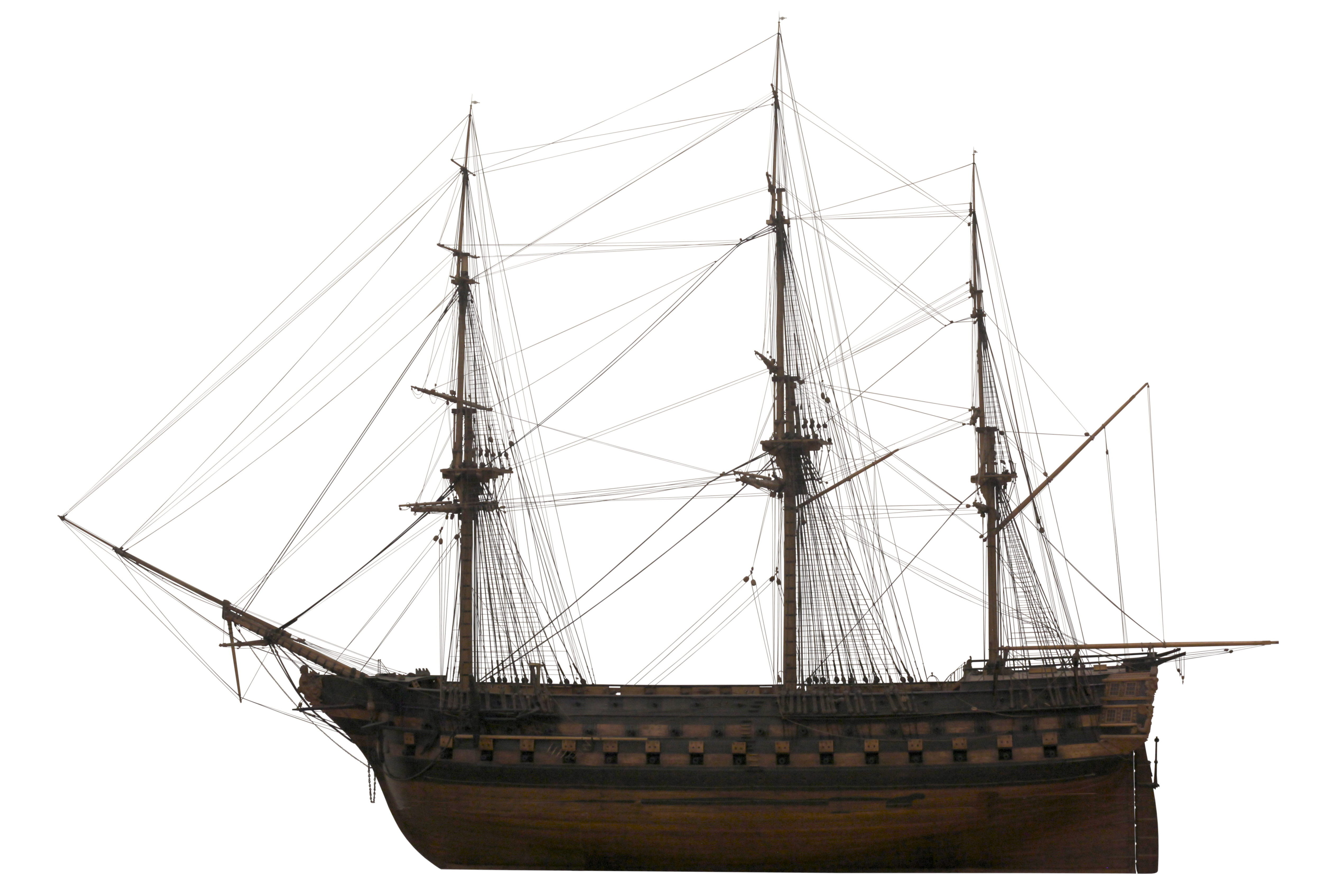
- 1/20th scale model of, lead ship of Bayard's class, on display at the Musée national de la Marine

History

France
- Name: Bayard
- Namesake: Pierre Terrail, seigneur de Bayard
- Builder: Lorient
- Laid down: 1 July 1823
- Launched: 28 August 1847
- Stricken: 20 June 1872
- Fate: Scrapped 1879

General characteristics
- Class & type: Suffren-class ship of the line
- Displacement: 4,070 tonnes
- Length: 60.50 m (198 ft 6 in)
- Beam: 16.28 m (53 ft 5 in)
- Draught: 7.40 m (24 ft 3 in)
- Propulsion: 3,114 m^{2} (33,520 sq ft) of sails
- Complement: 810 to 846 men
- Armament: 1824–1839: 30 × 30-pounder long guns on lower deck; 32 × 30-pounder short guns on middle deck; 24 × 30-pounder carronades and 4 × 18-pounders on upper decks; 1839–1840; 26 × 30-pounder long guns and 4 × 22cm Paixhans guns on lower deck; 32 × 30-pounder short guns on middle deck; 24 × 30-pounder carronades and 4 × 16 cm Paixhans guns on upper decks
- Armour: 6.97 cm of timber

Bayard was a 90-gun ship of the line of the French Navy. She was the first ship in French service named in honour of Pierre Terrail, seigneur de Bayard.

== Career ==
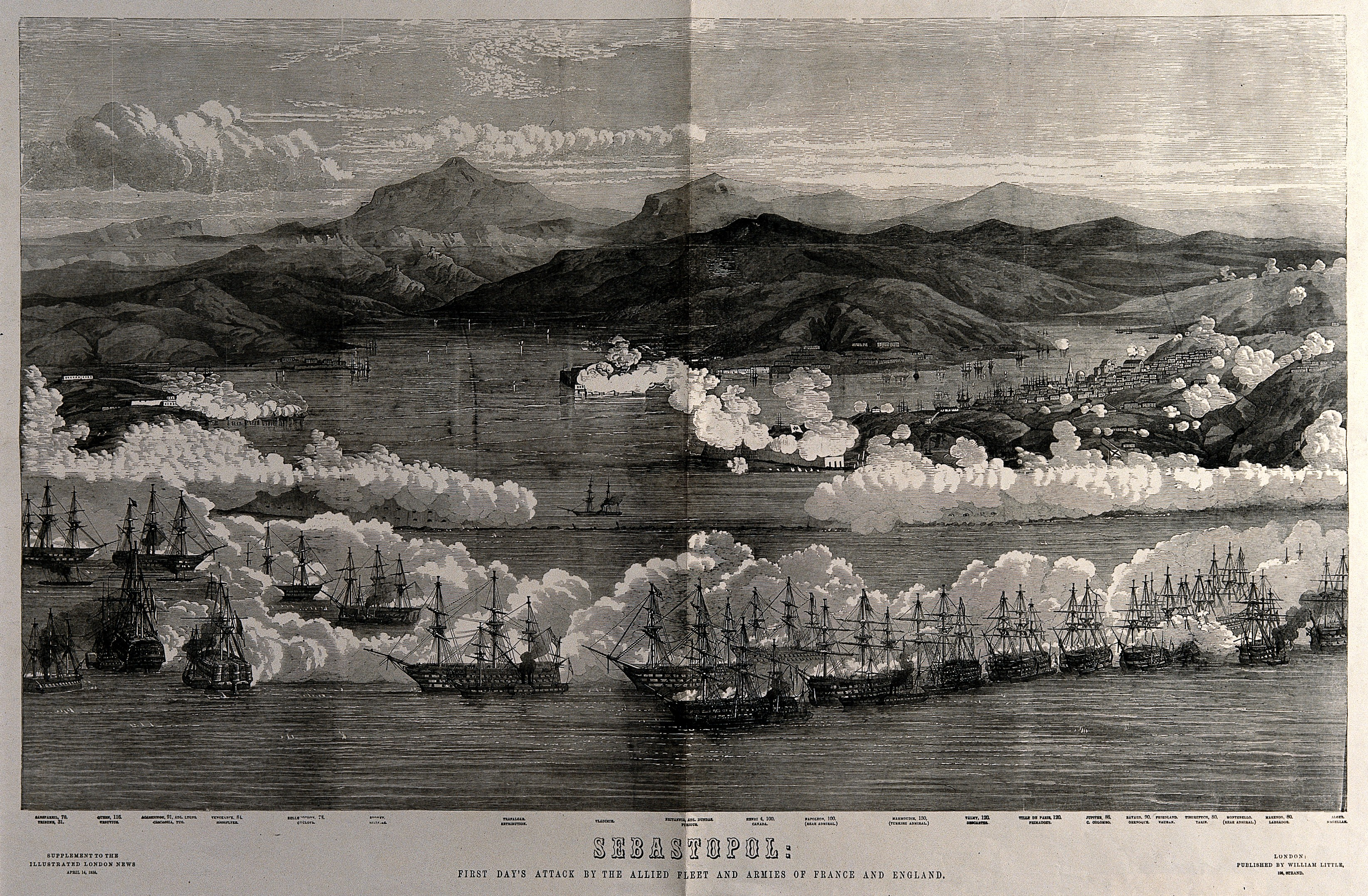
Bayard at Sevastopol, during the first day's attack by the allied fleet and armies of France and England on 17 October 1854

Bayard took part in the Crimean War in the Black Sea in 1854 and 1855, notably taking part in the Siege of Sevastopol by shelling the city on 17 October 1854. She suffered serious damage in the storm of 14 November, and returned to France to be place in ordinary.

In 1858, she was transformed into a steam and sail ship at Cherbourg, carrying out her first engine trials in 1860. The next year, she again suffered severe damage in a storm in the Strait of Magellan.

In 1866, she was used as a troopship to return the expeditionary corps back to France after the French intervention in Mexico. From 1871, she was used as a prison hulk in Cherbourg for prisoners from the Paris Commune. Struck on 20 June 1872, she was renamed Triton and eventually broken up in 1879.
