= French ship Jean Bart (1852) =

Ship of the line of the French Navy

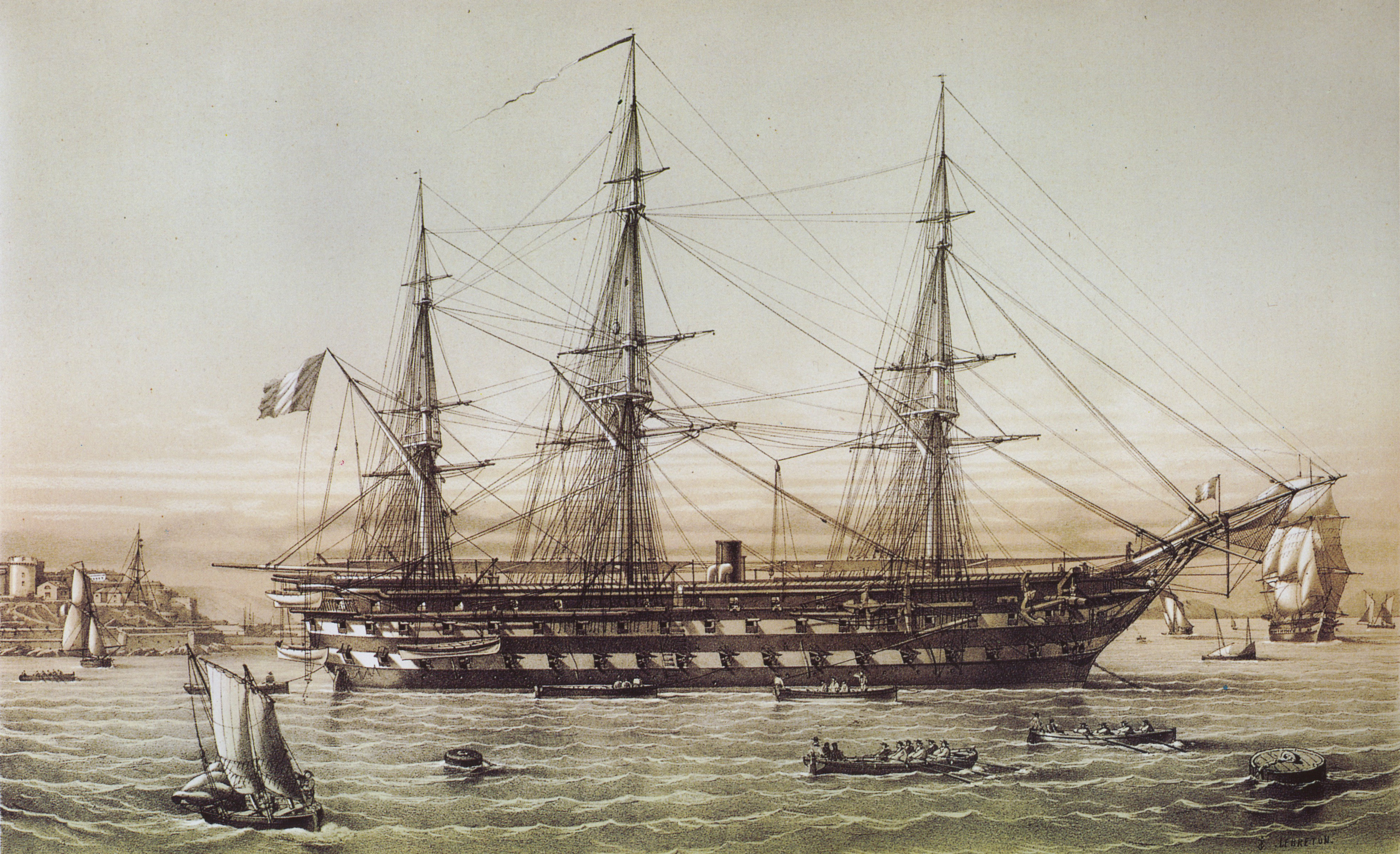
- The Jean Bart, drawing by Louis Le Breton

History

France
- Name: Jean Bart
- Namesake: Jean Bart
- Ordered: 16 October 1848
- Builder: Arsenal de Lorient
- Laid down: 26 January 1849
- Launched: 14 September 1852
- Completed: April 1853
- Commissioned: 11 April 1842
- Renamed: Donauwerth, 20 August 1868
- Stricken: 18 January 1869
- Fate: Scrapped, 1869

General characteristics (as built)
- Class & type: Suffren-class ship of the line
- Displacement: 4070 tonnes
- Length: 63.6 m (208 ft 8 in) (o/a)
- Beam: 16.26 m (53 ft 4 in)
- Draught: 7.4 m (24 ft 3 in) (mean)
- Depth: 8.05 m (26 ft 5 in)
- Installed power: 1,010 ihp (1,020 PS; 750 kW)
- Propulsion: 1 × shaft; 1 × direct-acting steam engine
- Sail plan: Full-rigged ship
- Speed: 10 knots (19 km/h; 12 mph)
- Complement: 814
- Armament: 76 muzzle-loading, smoothbore guns; Lower gundeck: 24 × 30-pounder long guns, 4 × 22 cm (8.7 in) long Paixhans guns; Upper gundeck: 24 × 30-pounder short guns, 4 × 22 cm (8.7 in) short Paixhans guns; Forecastle & Quarterdeck: 4 × 30-pounder long guns, 12 × 16 cm (6.3 in) Paixhans guns

Jean Bart was a third-rate Suffren-class ship of the line built for the French Navy during the 1850s. She had been laid down as a sailing ship of the line, but remained on the stocks until she was chosen for conversion to steam power in 1850. The ship participated in the Crimean War of 1854–1855. From 1864, Jean Bart served as a training ship. She exchanged names with Donawerth in 1868, and was scrapped the following year.

== Description ==
Jean Bart had an overall length of 63.6 metres (208 ft 8 in), a beam of 16.26 metres (53 ft 4 in) and a depth of hold of 8.05 metres (26 ft 5 in). The ship displaced 4070 tonnes and had a mean draught of 7.4 metres (24 ft 3 in). Her crew numbered 814 officers and ratings. She was powered by a direct-acting steam engine that drove the single propeller shaft. The engine, built by Indret, was rated at 450 nominal horsepower and produced 1,206 indicated horsepower (1,223 PS; 899 kW). During her sea trials, Jean Bart had a speed of 10 knots (19 km/h; 12 mph) under steam. She was fitted with three masts and ship rigged like the 80-gun sailing ships of the line in service.

The muzzle-loading, smoothbore armament of Jean Bart consisted of twenty-four 30-pounder long guns and four 22 cm (8.7 in) Paixhans guns on the lower gundeck. On the upper gundeck were twenty-four 30-pound short guns and four 22 cm Paixhans guns. On the quarterdeck and forecastle were a total of four 30-pounder long guns and a dozen 16 cm (6.3 in) Paixhans guns.

== Construction and career ==
Jean Bart had been ordered on 16 October 1848 and laid down as a 90-gun 3rd-rank Suffren-class ship of the line on 26 January 1849 at the Arsenal de Lorient, but construction was suspended before she was launched. Her incomplete hull was kept in a covered slipway until her conversion into a steam-powered ship was ordered on 4 February 1850. Major modifications to her hull were limited to lengthening her stern by 2.8 m (9 ft 2 in) and reshaping it to accommodate a hoisting mechanism for her propeller to eliminate its drag while under sail. Jean Bart was launched on 14 September 1852 and commissioned on 11 April 1853.

The ship took part in the Siege of Sevastopol (1854–1855) and the Battle of Kinburn (1855) during the Crimean War. She was converted into a training ship for naval cadets in 1864. Jean Bart exchanged names with Donawerth in 1868 and was broken up the following year.
