= French ship Fontenoy =

Ship of the line of the French Navy

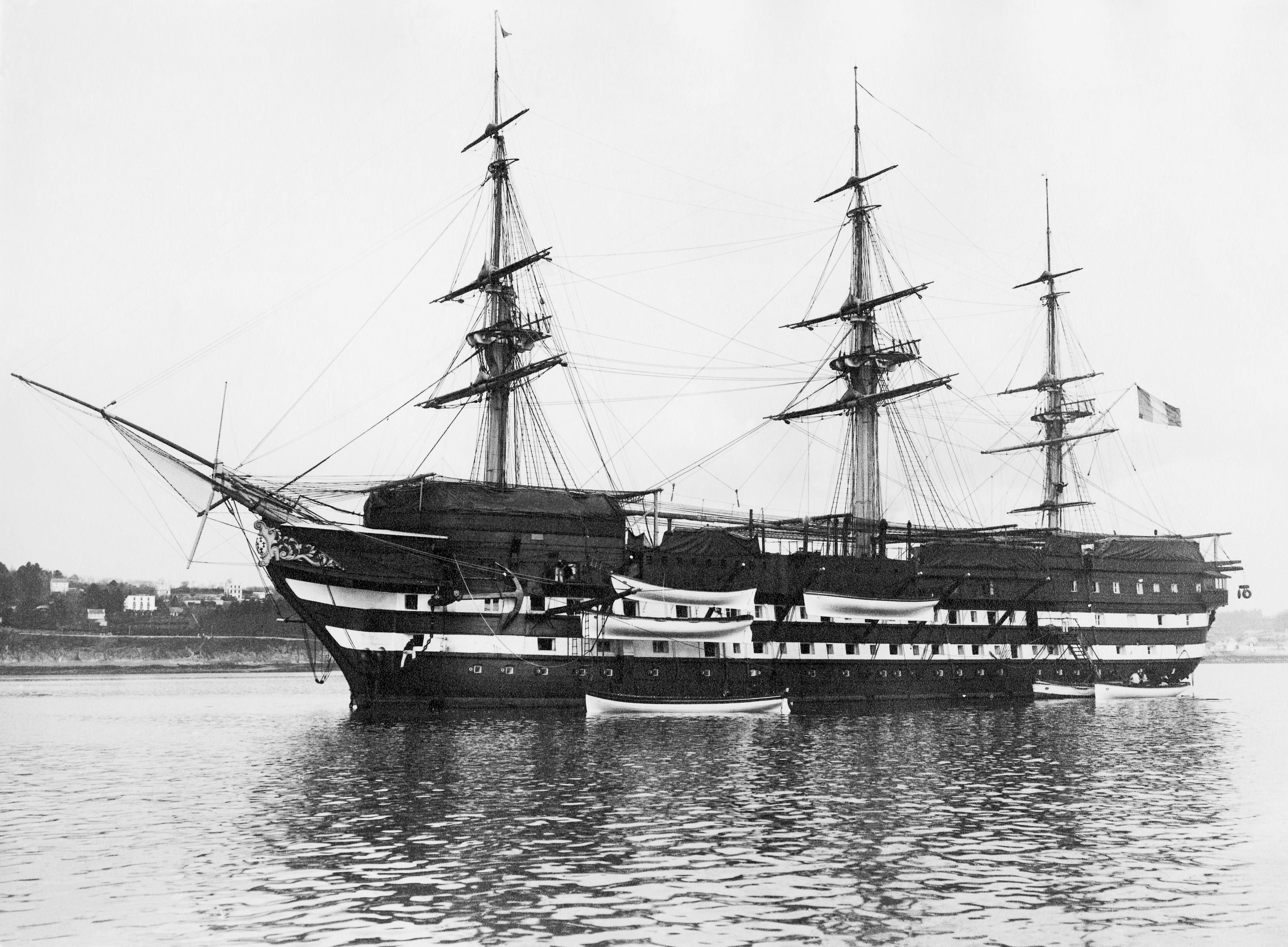
- 1900 Rade de Brest

History

France
- Name: Fontenoy
- Namesake: Battle of Fontenoy
- Builder: Toulon
- Laid down: July 1827
- Launched: 2 December 1858
- In service: 1860
- Stricken: 10 February 1892
- Fate: Scrapped 1911

General characteristics
- Class & type: Suffren-class ship of the line
- Displacement: 4,070 tonnes
- Length: 60.50 m (198 ft 6 in)
- Beam: 16.28 m (53 ft 5 in)
- Draught: 7.40 m (24 ft 3 in)
- Propulsion: 3,114 m^{2} (33,520 sq ft) of sails
- Complement: 810 to 846 men
- Armament: 1824–1839: 30 × 30-pounder long guns on lower deck; 32 × 30-pounder short guns on middle deck; 24 × 30-pounder carronades and 4 × 18-pounders on upper decks; 1839–1840; 26 × 30-pounder long guns and 4 × 22 cm Paixhans guns on lower deck; 32 × 30-pounder short guns on middle deck; 24 × 30-pounder carronades and 4 × 16 cm Paixhans guns on upper decks
- Armour: 6.97 cm (2.74 in) of timber

Fontenoy was a 90-gun Suffren-class ship of the line of the French Navy. She was the only vessel in French service named in honour of Battle of Fontenoy.

== Career ==
She was part of the Toulon squadron until 1871, when she was converted into a prison hulk for prisoners of the Paris Commune.

In 1878, her engines were removed and she became a transport. Her name changed to Bretagne and she was used as a boys' school ship for the École des mousses.

She was eventually decommissioned in 1892 and broken up in 1911.
