= French ship Castiglione =

Three ships of the French Navy have borne the name Castiglione in honour of the Battle of Castiglione

== Ships named Castiglione ==
- Castiglione (1799), a gunboat
- Castiglione (1812), a Téméraire-class 74-gun ship of the line
- Castiglione (1860), a 90-gun Suffren-class ship of the line

== Notes and references ==
=== Bibliography ===
- Roche, Jean-Michel (2005). Dictionnaire des bâtiments de la flotte de guerre française de Colbert à nos jours. Vol. 1. Group Retozel-Maury Millau. p. 101. ISBN 978-2-9525917-0-6. OCLC 165892922.
