= French ship Saint Louis =

Several ships of the French Navy have borne the name Saint Louis:

- French ship Saint Louis (1692), a 64-gun second rank two-decker ship of the line
- French ship Saint Louis (1854), a 90-gun Suffren-class ship of the line
- French battleship Saint Louis, a Charlemagne-class pre-dreadnought battleship
