= French ship Castiglione (1860) =

Ship of the line of the French Navy

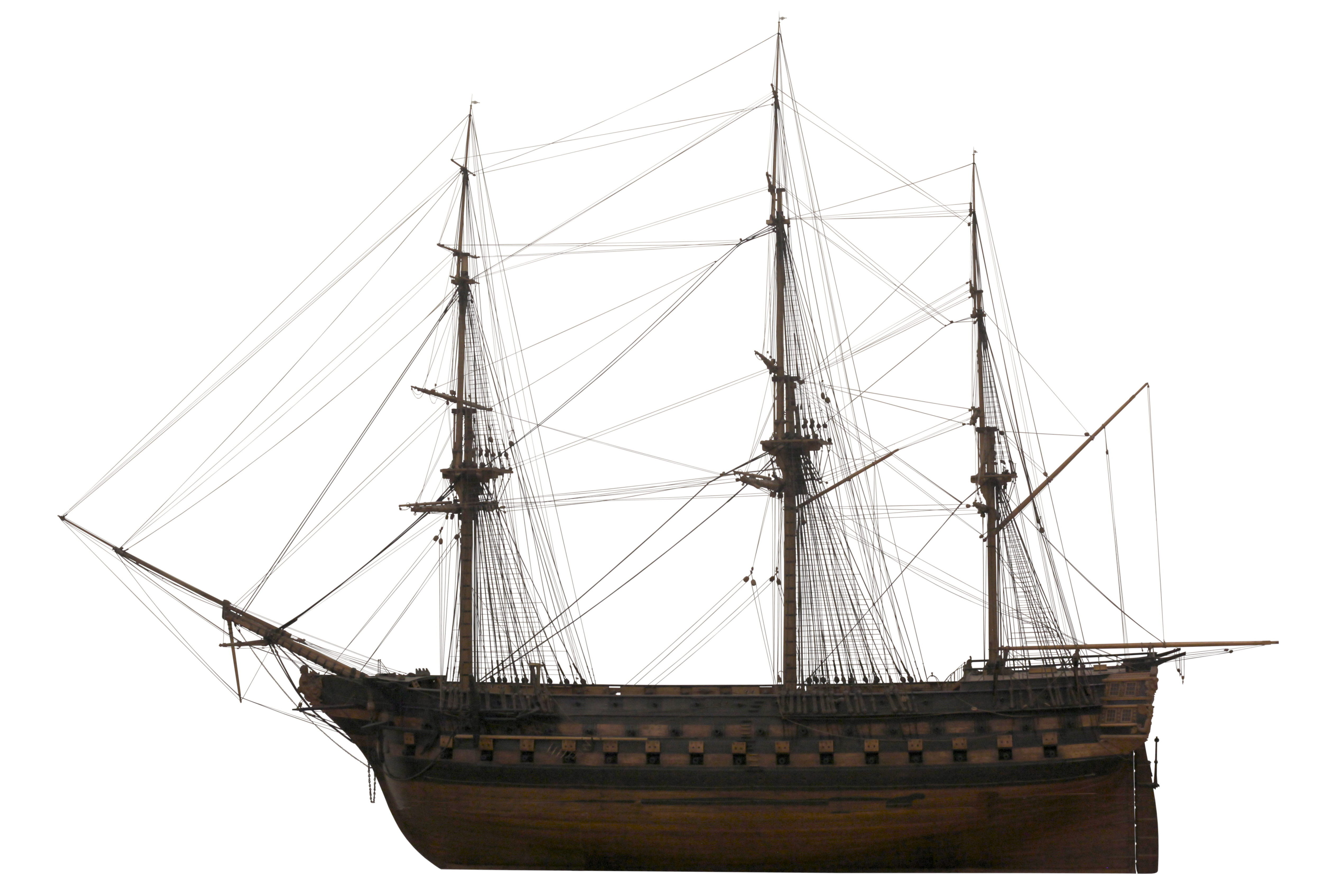
- 1/20th scale model of Suffren, lead ship of Castiglione's class, on display at the Musée national de la Marine

History

France
- Name: Castiglione
- Namesake: Battle of Castiglione
- Builder: Arsenal de Toulon
- Laid down: October 1835
- Launched: 4 July 1860
- Completed: May 1861
- Commissioned: 15 July 1860
- Decommissioned: 1 June 1867
- Reclassified: Converted into a troopship, December 1866; As barracks ship, 11 October 1881
- Stricken: 11 October 1881
- Fate: Scrapped, 1900

General characteristics
- Class & type: Suffren-class ship of the line
- Displacement: 4,070 tonnes
- Length: 60.50 m (198.5 ft)
- Beam: 16.28 m (53.4 ft)
- Draught: 7.40 m (24.3 ft)
- Propulsion: 3114 m^{2} of sails
- Complement: 810 to 846 men
- Armament: 1824-1839: 30 × 30-pounder long guns on lower deck; 32 × 30-pounder short guns on middle deck; 24 × 30-pounder carronades and 4 × 18-pounders on upper decks; 1839-1840; 26 × 30-pounder long guns and 4 × 22cm Paixhans guns on lower deck; 32 × 30-pounder short guns on middle deck; 24 × 30-pounder carronades and 4 × 16 cm Paixhans guns on upper decks
- Armour: 6.97 cm of timber

Castiglione was ordered as a third-rank, 90-gun sailing Suffren-class ship of the line for the French Navy, but was converted to a steam-powered ship in the 1850s while under construction. Completed in 1861 the ship participated in the Second French intervention in Mexico the following year. She was converted into a troopship in 1866 and was hulked in 1881, serving as a barracks ship until she was scrapped in 1900.

== Description ==
The Suffren-class ships were enlarged versions of the 80-gun Bucentaure-class ships of the line that had been designed by naval architect Jacques-Noël Sané. The conversion to steam power involved cutting Castiglione's frame in half amidships and building a new section to house the propulsion machinery and coal bunkers. The ship had a length at the waterline of 72.99 meters (239 ft 6 in), a beam of 16.28 meters (53 ft 5 in) and a depth of hold of 8.04 meters (26 ft 5 in). The ship displaced 5,137 tonnes and had a draught of 8.15 meters (26 ft 9 in) at deep load. Her crew numbered 913 officers and ratings. Details are lacking on her propulsion machinery, the only information available is that her two steam engines were rated at 800 nominal horsepower and produced 2,259 indicated horsepower (1,685 kW) which gave her a speed of 11.77 knots (21.80 km/h; 13.54 mph) during her sea trials.

The ship's armament consisted of eighteen 30-pounder (164.7 mm (6.5 in)) smoothbore cannon and sixteen 223.3 mm (8.8 in) Paixhans guns on the lower gundeck and thirty-four 30-pounder cannon on the upper gundeck. On the quarterdeck and forecastle were twenty 163 mm (6.4 in) Paixhans guns and a pair of 163 mm rifled muzzle-loading guns.

== Construction and career ==
Castiglione was laid down in October 1835 at the Arsenal de Toulon. She was ordered to be converted to steam power on 19 October 1854. The conversion began on 2 January 1856 and the ship was launched on 4 July 1860. Castiglione was commissioned on 15 July although her sea trials did not begin until May 1861.Castiglione took part in the French intervention in Mexico in 1862. She was struck on 11 October 1881 and used as a barracks hulk. She was eventually broken up in 1900.
