= French ship Masséna (1860) =

Ship of the line of the French Navy

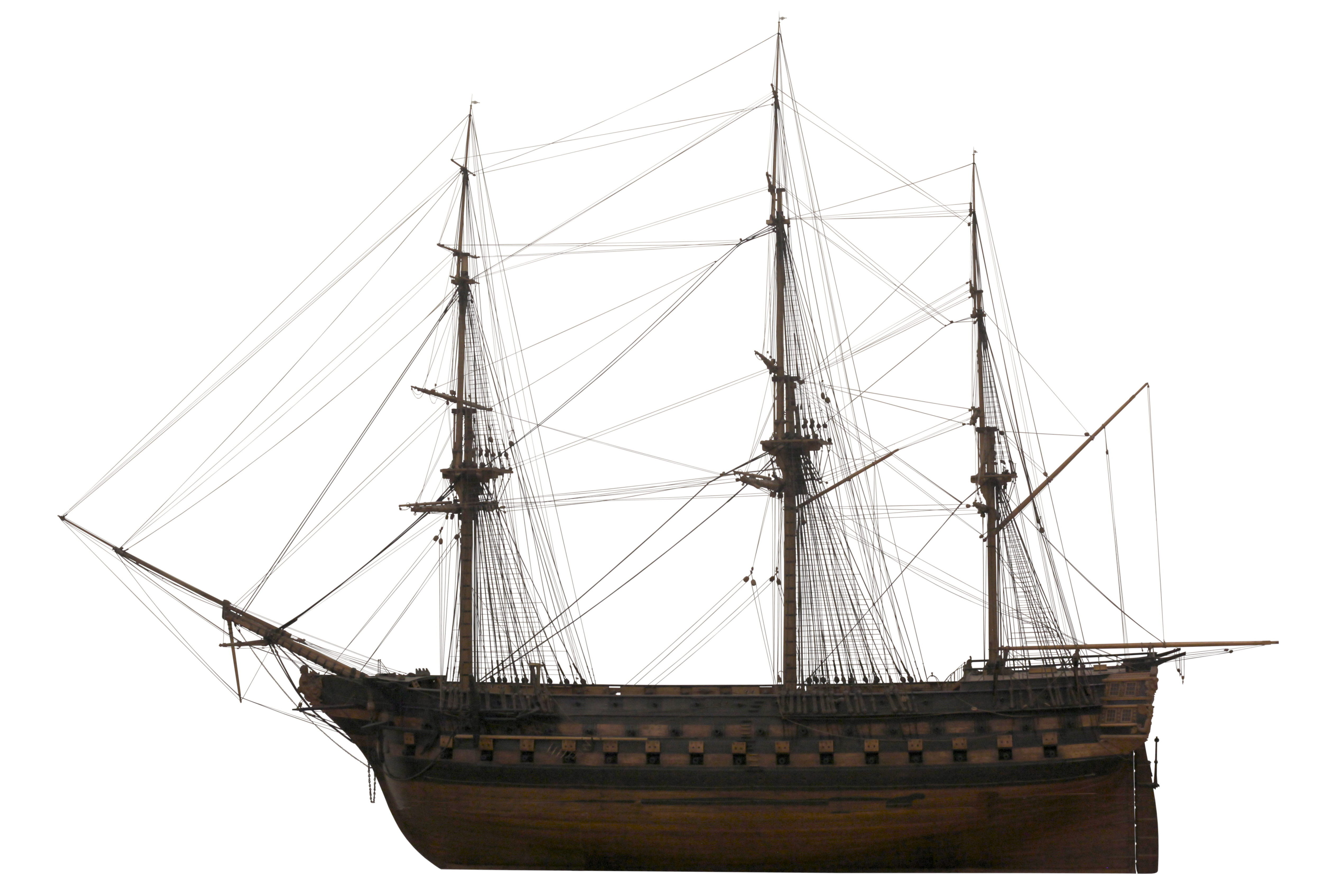
- 1/20th scale model of Suffren, lead ship of Masséna's class, on display at the Musée national de la Marine

History

France
- Name: Masséna
- Namesake: André Masséna
- Builder: Arsenal de Toulon
- Laid down: September 1835 as Spectre
- Launched: 15 March 1860
- Completed: November 1861
- Commissioned: 21 April 1860
- Decommissioned: 1 June 1867
- Renamed: Masséna, 24 April 1850; Mars, 1892
- Reclassified: As a troopship, July 1866; As a barracks ship, 9 May 1879
- Stricken: 9 May 1879
- Fate: Sank 18 June 1904; scrapped, 1905–1906

General characteristics (as of 1863)
- Class & type: Suffren-class ship of the line
- Displacement: 5,137 tonnes
- Length: 72.99 m (239 ft 6 in) (waterline)
- Beam: 16.28 m (53 ft 5 in)
- Draught: 8.15 m (26 ft 9 in) (full load)
- Depth of hold: 8.04 m (26 ft 5 in)
- Installed power: 2,189 ihp (1,632 kW) (trials)
- Propulsion: 1 screw; 2 steam engines
- Sail plan: Ship rigged
- Speed: 11.46 knots (21.22 km/h; 13.19 mph) (trials)
- Complement: 913
- Armament: Lower gundeck: 18 × 30 pdr cannon; 16 × 163 mm (6.4 in) rifled muzzle-loading (RML) guns; Upper gundeck: 34 × 30 pdr cannon; Quarterdeck and forecastle: 20 × 163 mm (6.4 in) Paixhans guns; 2 × 163 mm RML guns

Masséna was ordered as a third-rank, 90-gun sailing Suffren-class ship of the line for the French Navy, but was converted to a steam-powered ship in the 1850s while under construction. Completed in 1861 the ship participated in the Second French intervention in Mexico the following year. Hulked in 1879 and used as a barracks ship, the vessel sank at her moorings in 1904 and was subsequently scrapped in place.

== Description ==
The Suffren-class ships were enlarged versions of the 80-gun Bucentaure-class ships of the line that had been designed by naval architect Jacques-Noël Sané. The conversion to steam power involved cutting Masséna's frame in half amidships and building a new section to house the propulsion machinery and coal bunkers. The ship had a length at the waterline of 72.99 meters (239 ft 6 in), a beam of 16.28 meters (53 ft 5 in) and a depth of hold of 8.04 meters (26 ft 5 in). The ship displaced 5,137 tonnes and had a draught of 8.15 meters (26 ft 9 in) at deep load. Her crew numbered 913 officers and ratings. Details are lacking on her propulsion machinery, the only information available is that her two steam engines were rated at 800 nominal horsepower and produced 2,189 indicated horsepower (1,632 kW) which gave her a speed of 11.46 knots (21.22 km/h; 13.19 mph) during her sea trials.

The ship's armament consisted of eighteen 30-pounder (164.7 mm (6.5 in)) smoothbore cannon and sixteen 163 mm (6.4 in) rifled muzzle-loading (MLR) guns on the lower gundeck and thirty-four 30-pounder cannon on the upper gundeck. On the quarterdeck and forecastle were twenty 163 mm Paixhans guns and a pair of 163 mm MLR guns.

== Construction and career ==
Laid down as Spectre in September 1835 at the Arsenal de Rochefort, the ship was renamed Masséna on 2 April 1850. She was ordered to be converted to steam power on 19 October 1854. The conversion began on 12 March 1856 and the ship was launched on 15 March 1860. Masséna was commissioned on 21 April 1860 although her sea trials did not begin until November 1861. The ship ferried troops to Mexico in 1861–1862. She was used as a transport from 1867, and stricken on 9 May 1879. From 1880, she was used as barracks in Toulon, and she was eventually broken up in 1906.
