= French ship Valmy (1847) =

Ship of the line of the French Navy

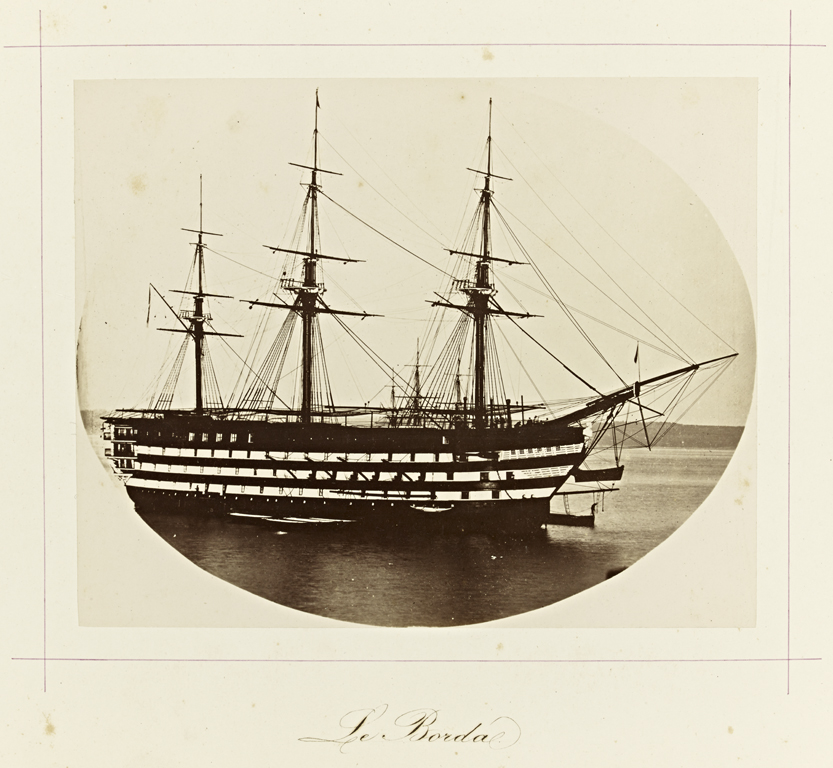
- The Valmy, by then renamed Borda, serving as a school ship

History

France
- Namesake: Battle of Valmy; Jean-Charles de Borda
- Builder: Brest shipyard. Plans by Leroux
- Laid down: 1 March 1838
- Launched: 25 September 1847
- Commissioned: 1849
- Decommissioned: January 1856
- Renamed: renamed Borda on 18 August 1863; renamed Intrépide in 1890
- Reclassified: 1863 schoolship
- Stricken: 1890
- Home port: Brest
- Fate: Scrapped in 1891

General characteristics
- Class & type: 1st rate ship of the line
- Displacement: 5,826 tonnes
- Length: 64.05 m (210.1 ft) at the waterline
- Beam: 18.11 m (59.4 ft)
- Draught: 8.61 m (28.2 ft)
- Complement: 1100
- Armament: 120 guns, including: 34 long guns of calibre 80; 36 short guns of calibre 30
- Armour: timber

Valmy, named after the Battle of Valmy, was the largest three-decker of the French Navy, and the largest tall ship ever built in France.

== Design ==
The design of Valmy was decided by the Commission de Paris, as a way to modernise the 118-gun Océan class design and its derivatives. The most radical departure from previous designs was the shedding of tumblehome and adoption of vertical sides, shared by the Hercule and Suffren classes; this significantly increased the space available for upper batteries, but reduced the stability of the ship.

Valmy was laid down at Brest in 1838 as Formidable and launched in 1847.

She displayed poor performances during her trials, especially with a tendency to roll, and was generally considered a failure. Stability problems were to some extent improved by the addition of a 3 m (9.8 ft) high belt of wood sheathing at the waterline. The outcome of the project led the French Navy to return to a more traditional design with the next generation of ships, which would lead to Bretagne.

== Career ==
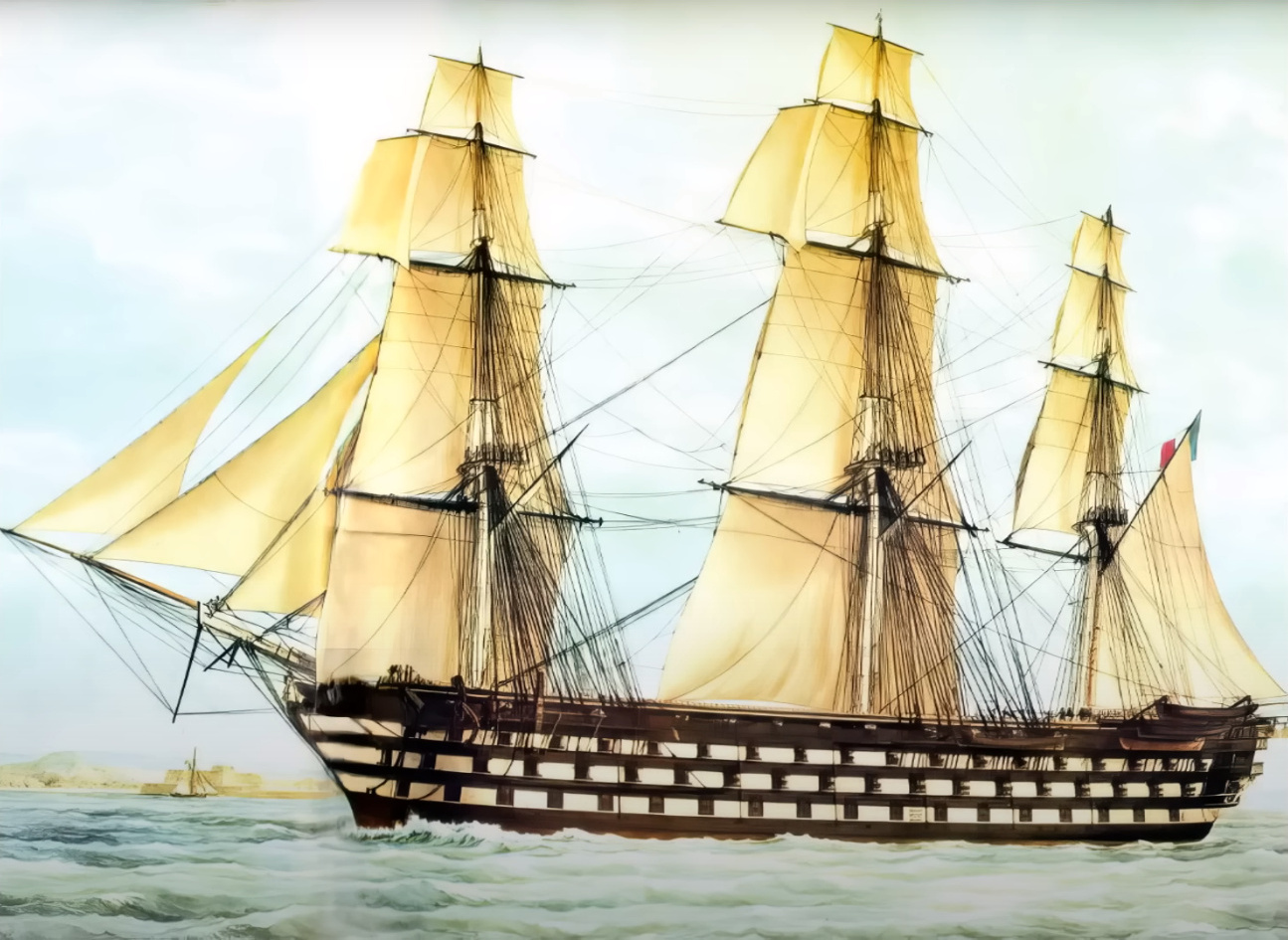
Watercolour of the Valmy, by F. Roux

Valmy participated in the Crimean War, where she proved difficult to manoeuvre and, like other sailing vessels, often had to be towed by steam ships. During the bombardment of Sevastopol, the only time Valmy fired her guns in anger, she was towed by the new steam two-decker Napoléon.

On 13 November 1855, Valmy collided with the French schooner Etoile du Nord in the Mediterranean Sea. The schooner was dismasted and Valmy put in to Málaga, Spain. She returned to Brest in 1855, where she was disarmed. In 1864, she was renamed Borda and became a training hulk for the French Naval Academy. Upon her replacement in 1890, she was renamed Intrépide. She was stricken from the navy list in 1891 and scrapped soon afterwards.

== Gallery ==
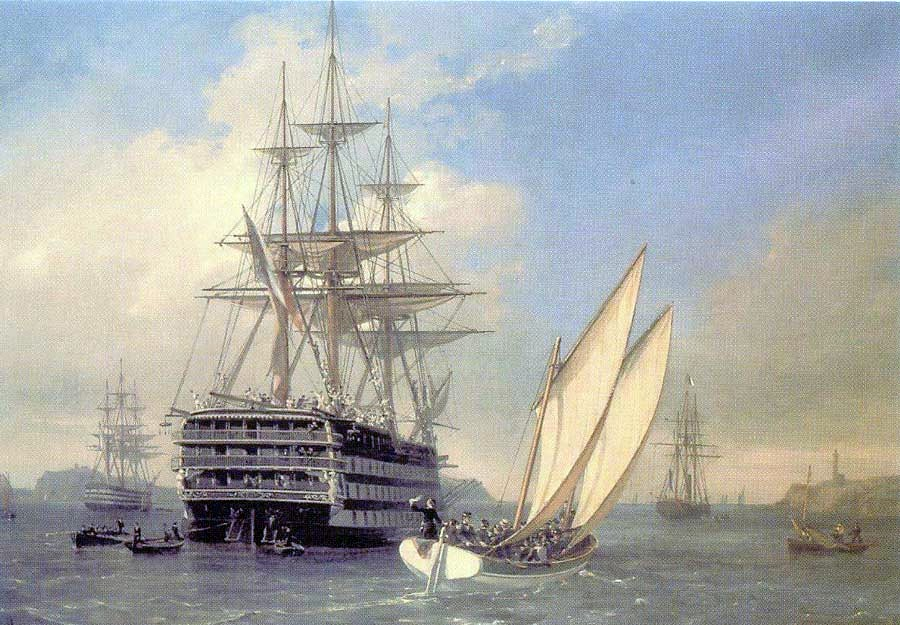
Visit by Imperatrice Eugénie aboard the Borda (ex-Valmy) on 26 July 1867, by Auguste Mayer

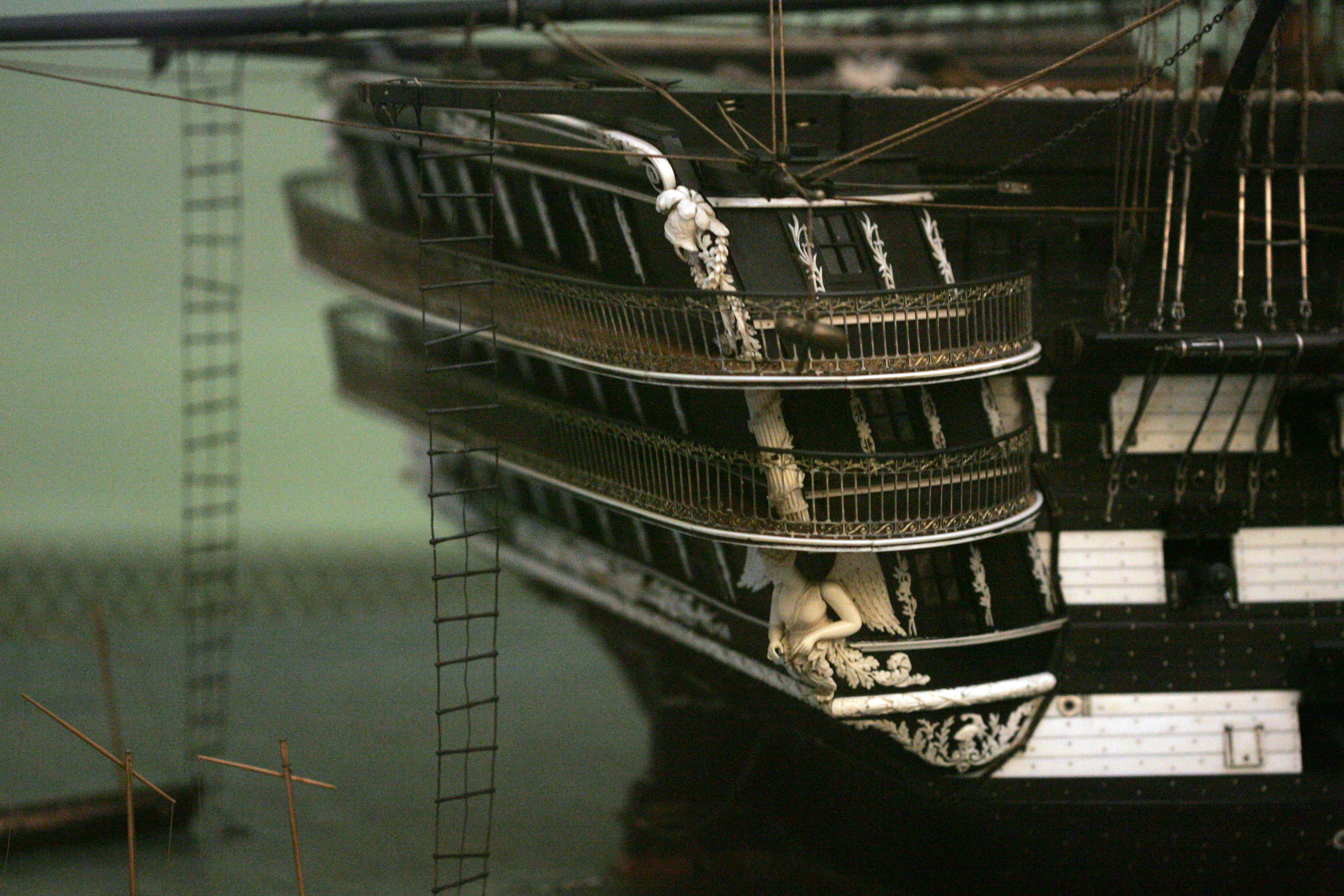
1/40th-scale model of the Valmy

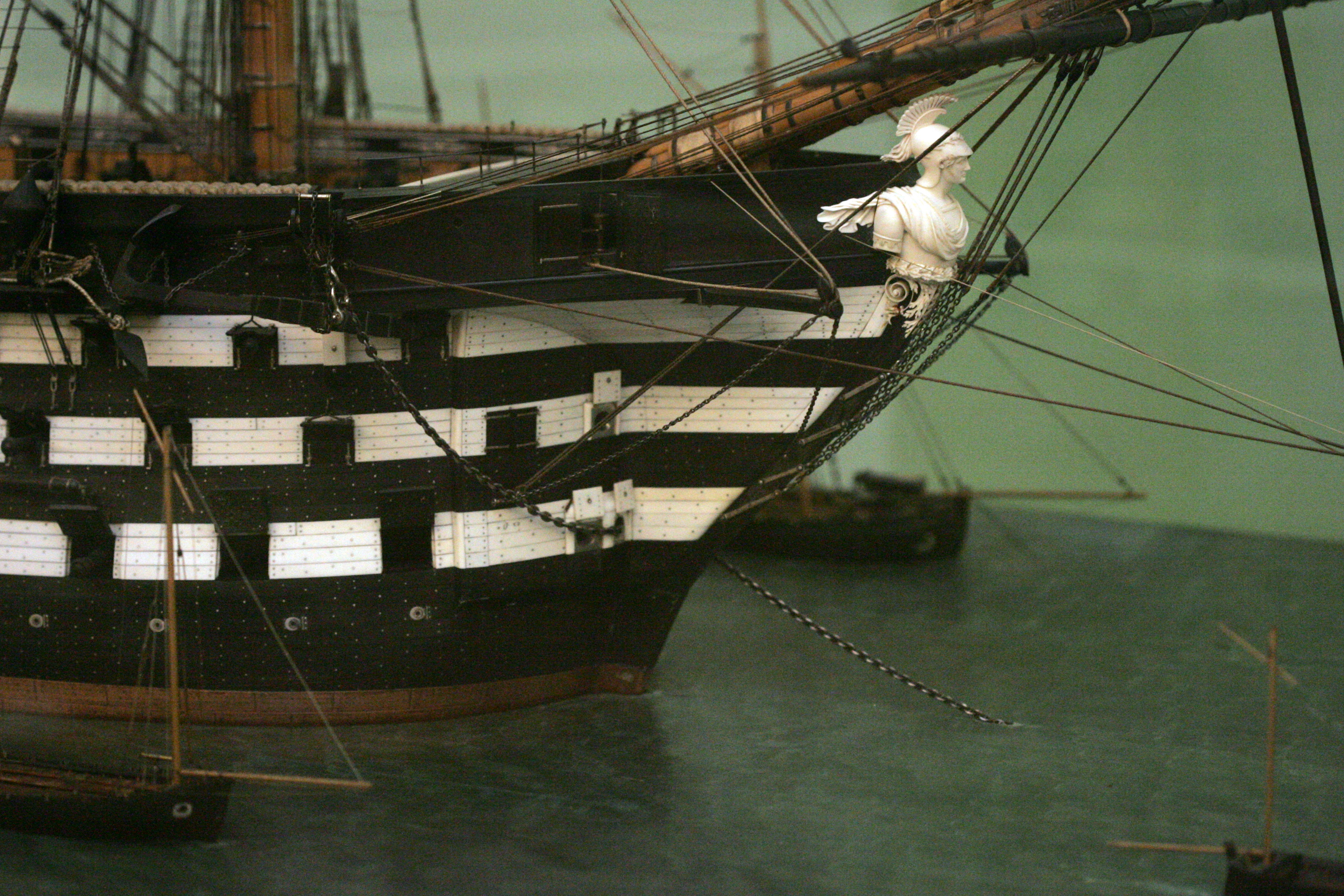
1/40th-scale model of the Valmy

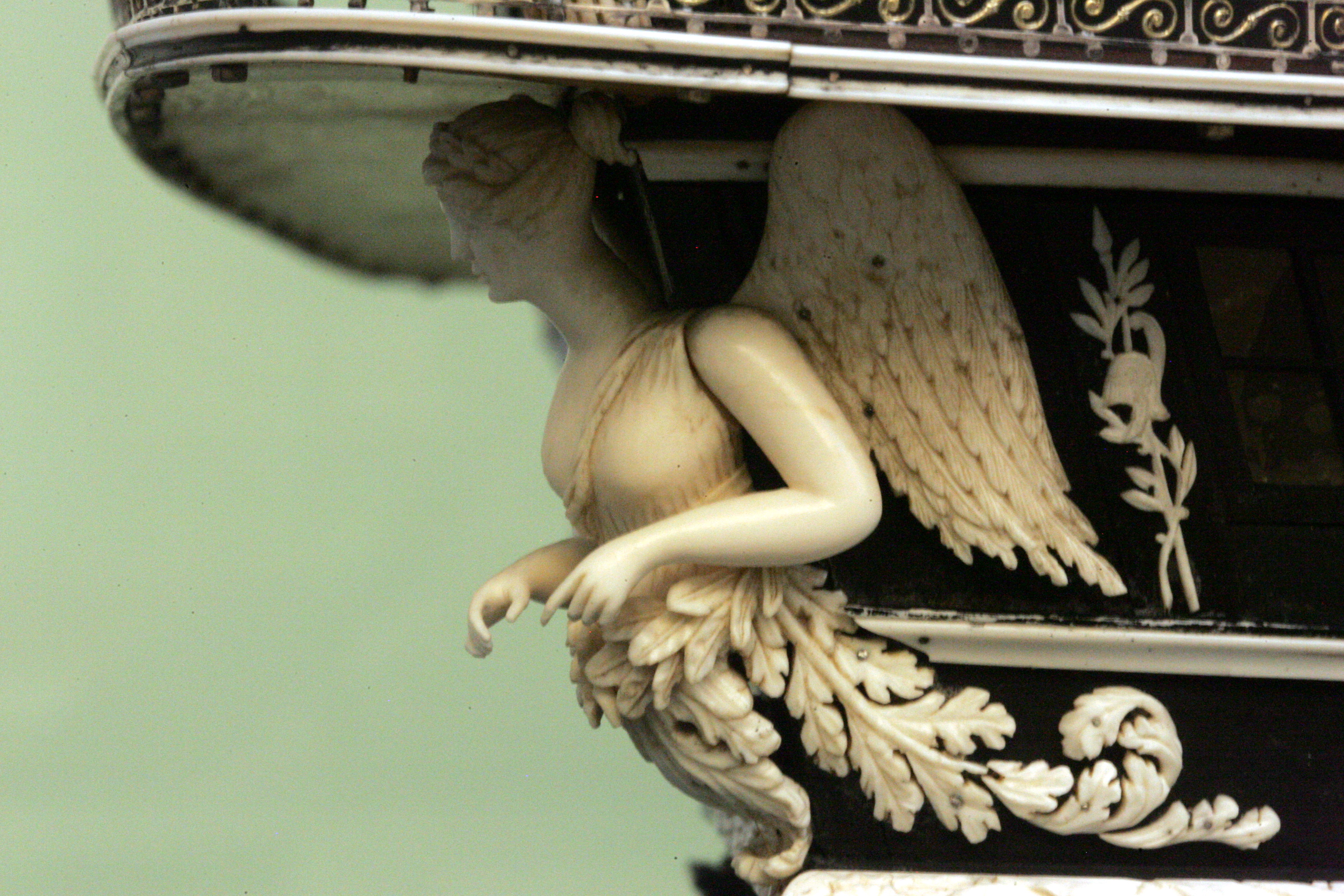
1/40th-scale model of the Valmy

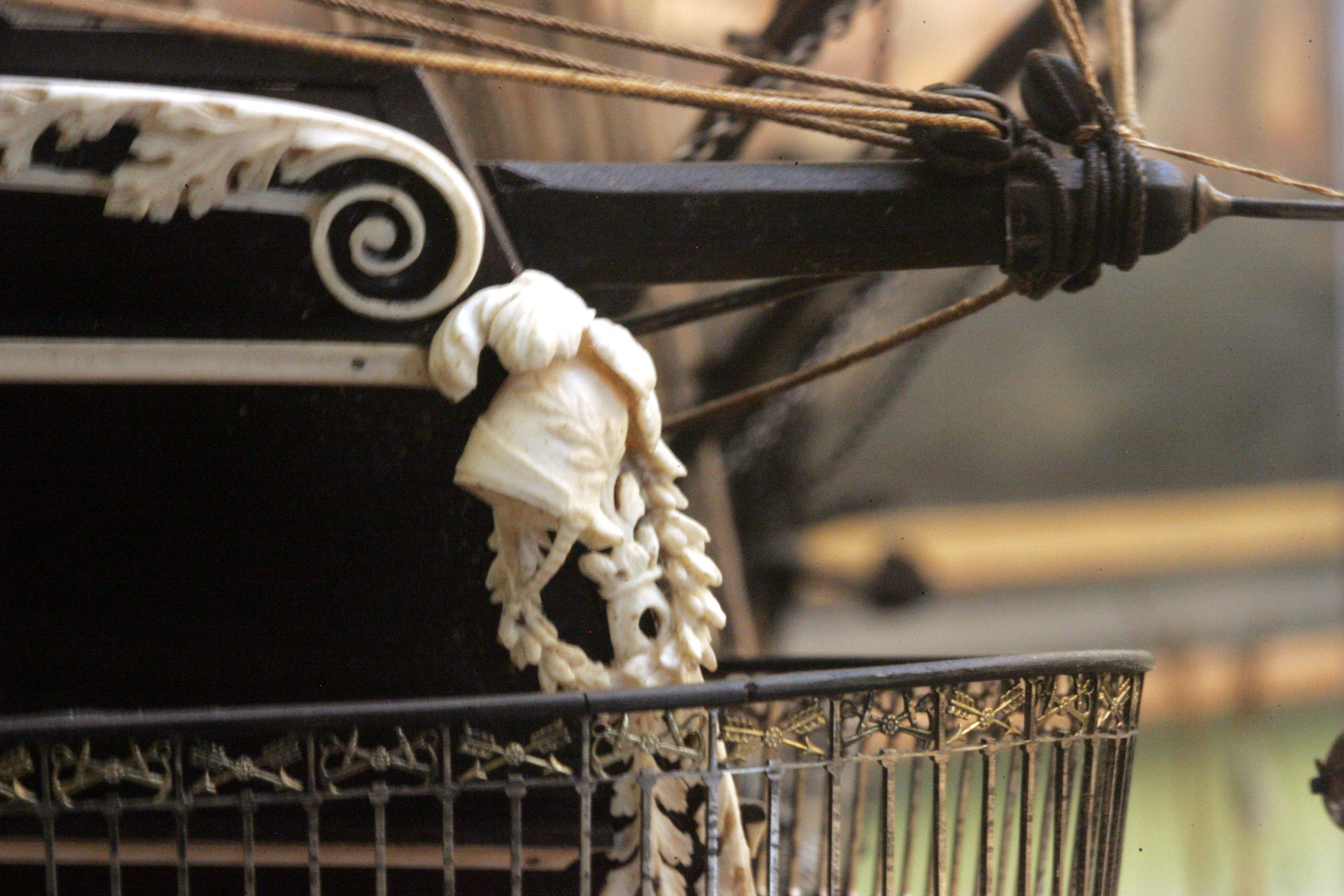
1/40th-scale model of the Valmy

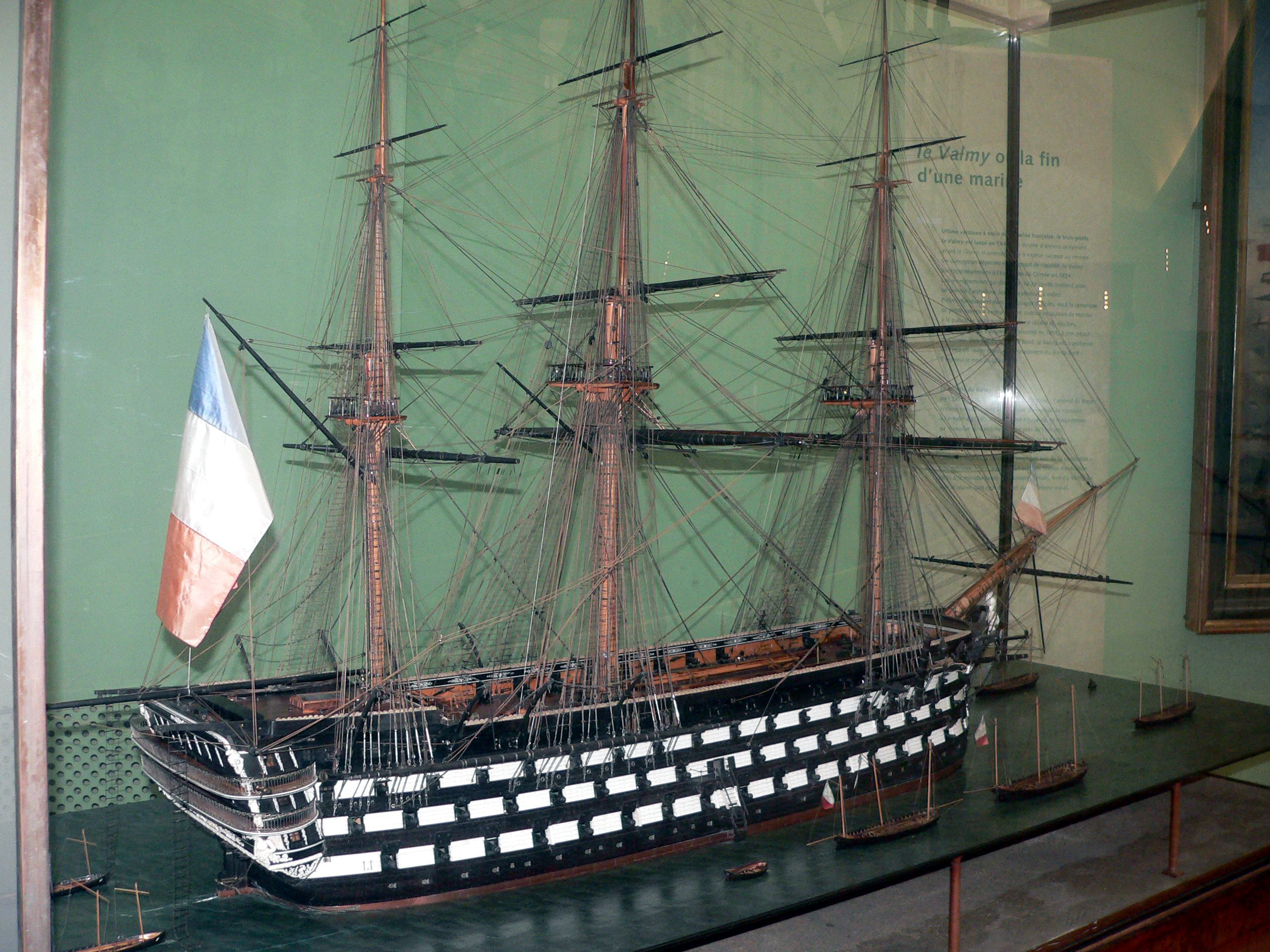
1/40th-scale model of the Valmy

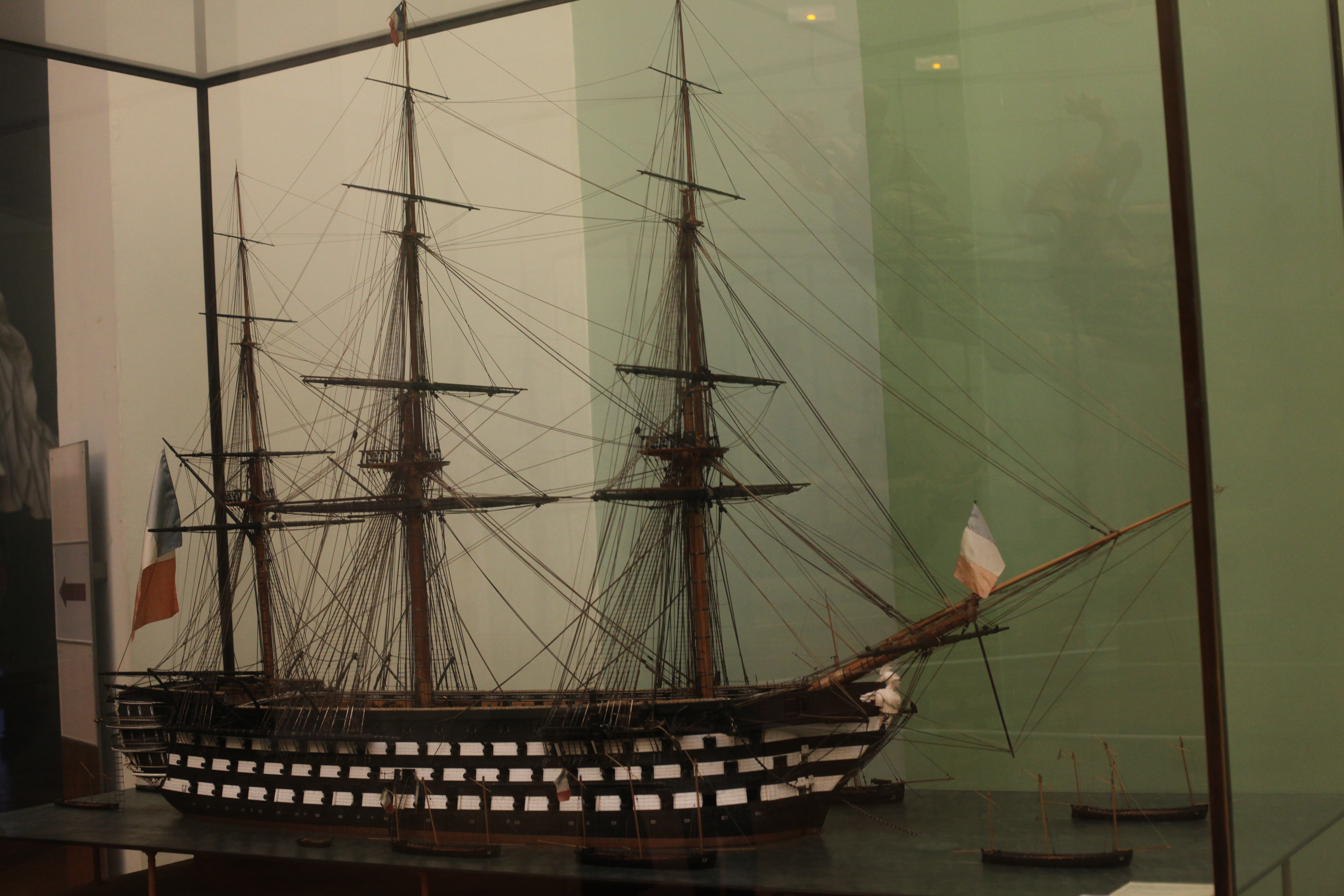
1/40th-scale model of the Valmy

== Bibliography ==
- Jones, Colin (1996). "Entente Cordiale, 1865". In McLean, David & Preston, Antony (eds.). Warship 1996. London: Conway Maritime Press. ISBN 0-85177-685-X.
- Roche, Jean-Michel (2005). Dictionnaire des bâtiments de la flotte de guerre française de Colbert à nos jours 1 1671–1870. Roche. ISBN 978-2-9525917-0-6. OCLC 165892922.
