= French ship Inflexible (1839) =

Ship of the line of the French Navy

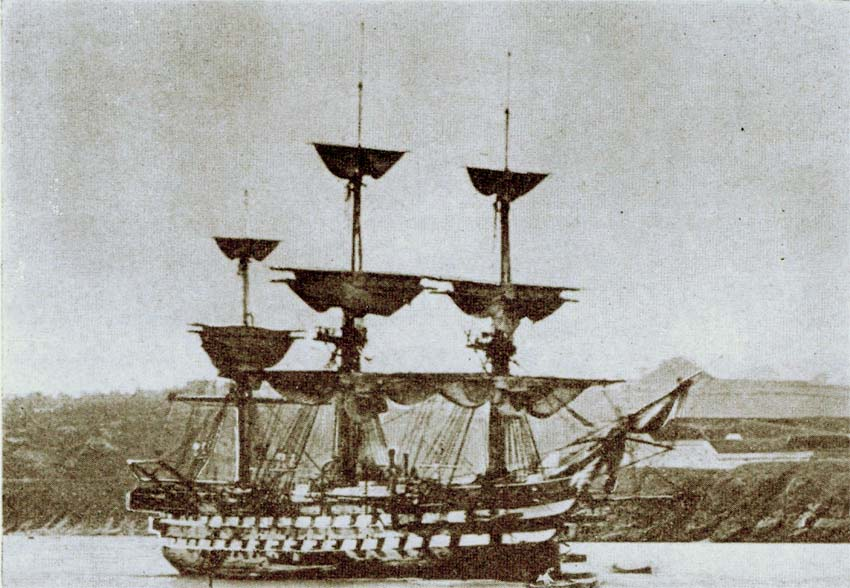
- Inflexible as a boys' school

History

France
- Name: Inflexible
- Namesake: Inflexible
- Builder: Rochefort
- Laid down: 18 August 1824
- Launched: 21 November 1839
- Commissioned: 24 August 1840
- Stricken: 1875
- Fate: Broken up 1875

General characteristics
- Class & type: Suffren-class ship of the line
- Displacement: 4,070 tonnes
- Length: 60.50 m (198 ft 6 in)
- Beam: 16.28 m (53 ft 5 in)
- Draught: 7.40 m (24 ft 3 in)
- Propulsion: 3,114 m^{2} (33,520 sq ft) of sails
- Complement: 810 to 846 men
- Armament: 1824–1839: 30 × 30-pounder long guns on lower deck; 32 × 30-pounder short guns on middle deck; 24 × 30-pounder carronades and 4 × 18-pounders on upper decks; 1839–1840; 26 × 30-pounder long guns and 4 × 22cm Paixhans guns on lower deck; 32 × 30-pounder short guns on middle deck; 24 × 30-pounder carronades and 4 × 16 cm Paixhans guns on upper decks
- Armour: 6.97 cm (2.74 in) of timber

Inflexible was a 90-gun Suffren-class ship of the line of the French Navy

== Career ==
Commissioned in Rochefort in 1840, Inflexible was appointed to the Mediterranean squadron, where she served from 1841 under Captain Guérin des Essarts.

From 1860, she was used as a boys' school in Brest, and was eventually broken up in 1875.
