= French ship Breslaw (1848) =

Ship of the line of the French Navy

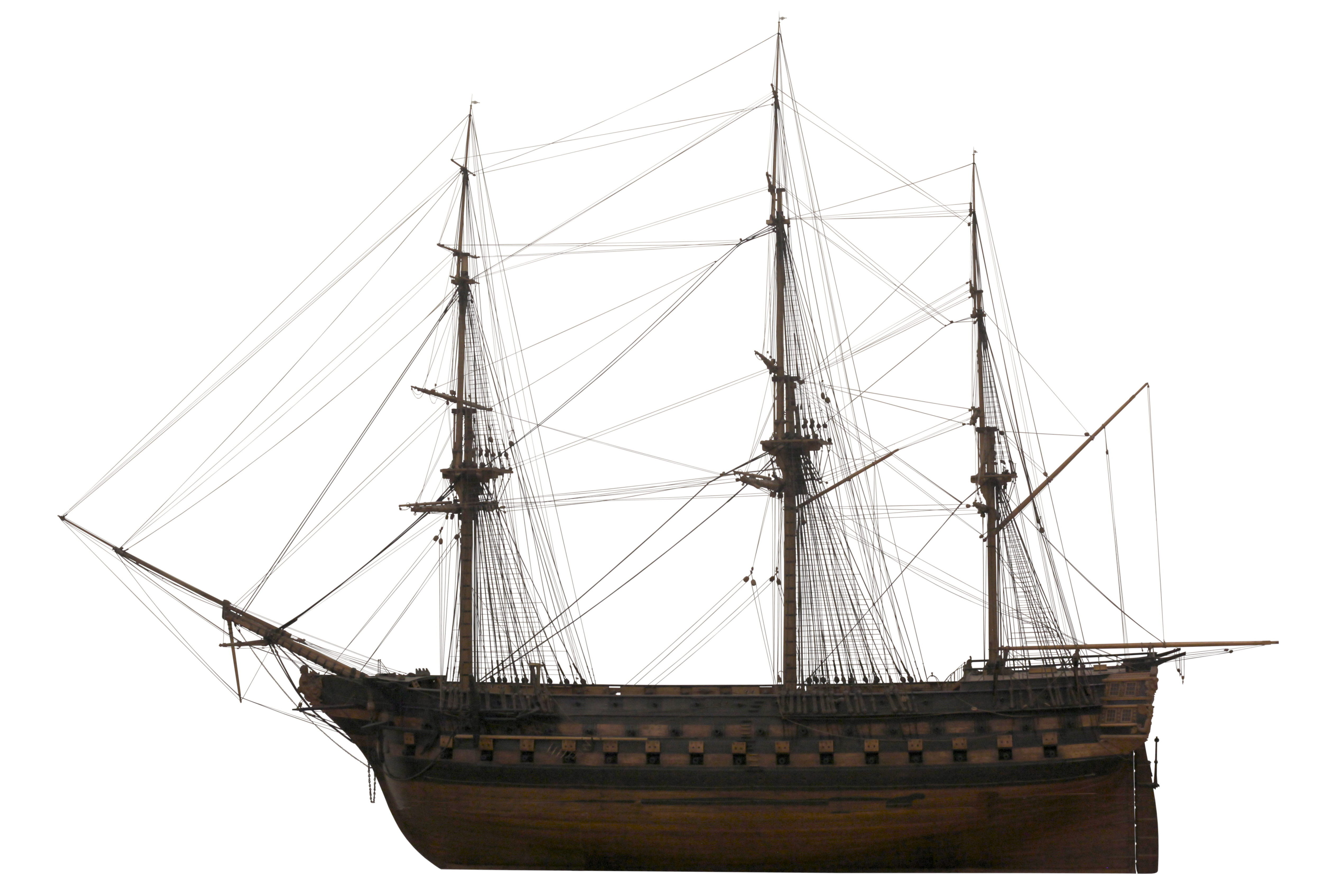
- 1/20th scale model of Suffren, lead ship of Breslaw's class, on display at the Musée national de la Marine

History

France
- Name: Breslaw
- Namesake: Wrocław
- Builder: Brest
- Laid down: 26 May 1827
- Launched: 21 July 1848
- Stricken: 22 July 1872
- Fate: Scrapped 1886

General characteristics
- Class & type: Breslaw-class ship of the line
- Displacement: 4,289 t (4,221 long tons)
- Length: 63.54 m (208 ft 6 in) (gun deck)
- Beam: 16.28 m (53 ft 5 in)
- Draught: 8.44 m (27 ft 8 in)=
- Depth: 8.05 m (26 ft 5 in)
- Propulsion: 1 × shaft; 1 × Horizontal-return connecting rod-steam engine
- Sail plan: Full-rigged ship
- Complement: 814
- Armament: 80 muzzle-loading, smoothbore guns; Lower gun deck: 16 × 30 pdr long guns, 14 × 22 cm (8.7 in) long Paixhans guns; Upper gun deck: 30 × 30 pdr short guns; Forecastle & Quarterdeck: 2 × 16 cm (6.3 in) rifled guns, 12 × 30 pdr short guns, 6 × 30 pdr carronades

Breslaw was the lead ship of her class of steam-powered, third-rate, 80 gun ships of the line built for the French Navy during the 1850s. She had been laid down as a Suffren-class sailing ship of the line in 1827, but remained on the stocks until the ship was launched in 1848 and completed the following year. Breslaw played a minor role in the Crimean War of 1854–1855. The ship was chosen for conversion to steam power in 1854.

== Description ==
Breslaw had a length of 63.54 metres (208 ft 6 in) at the gun deck a beam of 16.28 metres (53 ft 5 in) and a depth of hold of 8.05 metres (26 ft 5 in). The ship displaced 4,289 tonnes (4,221 long tons) and had a mean draught of 8.44 metres (27 ft 8 in). Her crew numbered 814 officers and ratings. She was powered by a horizontal-return connecting rod-steam engine that drove the single propeller shaft. The engine, built by Arsenal de Brest, was rated at 500 nominal horsepower. She was fitted with three masts and ship rigged like the 80-gun sailing ships of the line in service.

The muzzle-loading, smoothbore armament of Breslaw consisted of sixteen 36-pounder long guns and fourteen 22 cm (8.7 in) Paixhans guns on the lower gun deck. On the upper gundeck were twenty-four 30-pound short guns. On the quarterdeck and forecastle were a total of two 16 cm (6.3 in) rifled guns, a dozen 30-pounder short guns, and six 30-pounder carronades.

== Construction and career ==
Breslaw had been laid down as a 90-gun 3rd-rank Suffren-class ship of the line on 26 May 1827 at the Arsenal de Brest under the name of Achille, but construction was suspended. The ship was renamed Breslaw on 23 November 1839. Her incomplete hull was kept in a covered slipway until she was launched on 31 July 1848. The ship was completed in 1849, but was not commissioned until 1 March 1854. Breslaw served as a troopship during the Crimean War.

The ship's conversion into a steam-powered ship was ordered on 19 October 1854, although work did not begin until February 1856 at the Arsenal de Brest. Breslaw was re-launched later that year, recommissioned on 24 March 1858 and completed later that month. She served in the French intervention in Mexico in 1862. She was used as a prison hulk for prisoners of the Paris Commune, then as an ammunition store, and was eventually broken up in 1886.
