= French ship Breslaw =

French ship Breslaw may refer to:

- French ship Breslaw (1808)
- French ship Breslaw (1848)
