= French ship Saint Louis (1854) =

Ship of the line of the French Navy

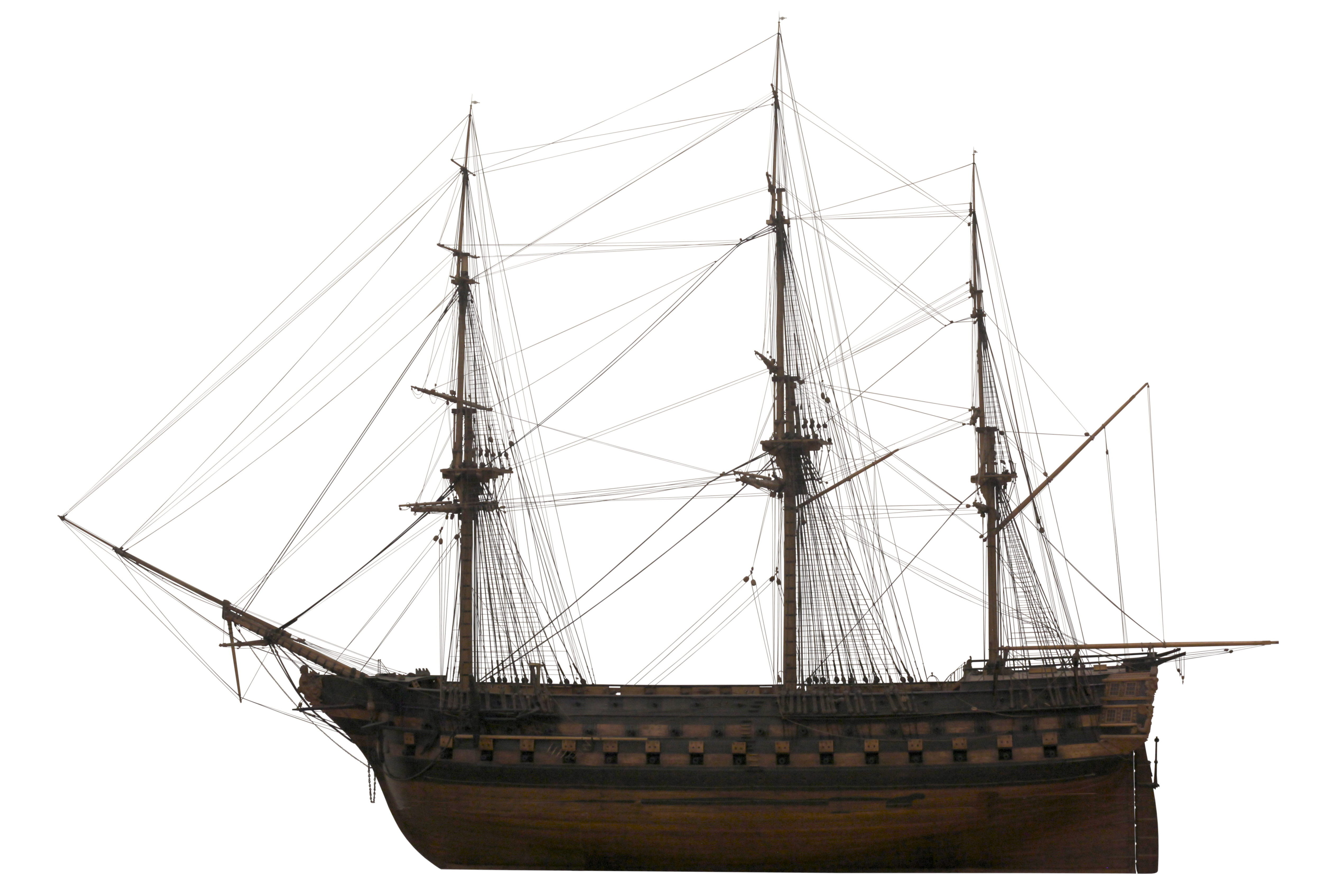
- 1/20th scale model of Suffren, lead ship of Saint Louis's class, on display at the Musée national de la Marine

History

France
- Name: Saint Louis
- Namesake: Louis IX of France
- Builder: Brest
- Laid down: 13 July 1848
- Launched: 25 April 1854
- Completed: June 1854
- Renamed: From Achille, 2 April 1850
- Stricken: 26 November 1894
- Fate: Scrapped, 1895

General characteristics
- Class & type: Donawerth-class ship of the line
- Displacement: 4,231 tonnes
- Length: 60.5 m (198 ft 6 in) (gun deck)
- Beam: 16.28 m (53 ft 5 in)
- Draught: 8.2 m (26 ft 11 in)
- Depth: 8.05 m (26 ft 5 in)
- Installed power: 1,175 ihp (1,191 PS; 876 kW)
- Propulsion: 1 × shaft; 1 × Horizontal-return connecting rod-steam engine
- Sail plan: Full-rigged ship
- Speed: 9 knots (17 km/h; 10 mph)
- Complement: 814
- Armament: 80 muzzle-loading, smoothbore guns; Lower gun deck: 16 × 36-pounder long guns, 14 × 22 cm (8.7 in) long Paixhans guns; Upper gun deck: 30 × 30-pounder short guns; Forecastle & Quarterdeck: 2 × 16 cm (6.3 in) rifled guns, 18 × 30 pdr carronades

Saint Louis was a steam-powered, third-rate, 80 gun Donawerth-class ship of the line built for the French Navy during the 1850s. She had been laid down as a Suffren-class sailing ship of the line, but remained on the stocks until she was chosen for conversion to steam power in 1854. The ship played a minor role in the Crimean War of 1854–1855.

== Description ==
Saint Louis had a length of 60.5 metres (198 ft 6 in) at the gun deck a beam of 16.28 metres (53 ft 5 in) and a depth of hold of 8.05 metres (26 ft 5 in). The ship displaced 4,231 tonnes and had a mean draught of 7.4 metres (24 ft 3 in). Her crew numbered 814 officers and ratings. She was powered by a horizontal-return connecting rod-steam engine that drove the single propeller shaft. The engine, built by Mazeline, was rated at 450 nominal horsepower and produced 1,411 indicated horsepower (1,431 PS; 1,052 kW). During her sea trials, Saint Louis had a speed of 9.9 knots (18.3 km/h; 11.4 mph) under steam. She was fitted with three masts and ship rigged like the 80-gun sailing ships of the line in service.

The muzzle-loading, smoothbore armament of Donawerth consisted of sixteen 36-pounder long guns and fourteen 22 cm (8.7 in) Paixhans guns on the lower gun deck. On the upper gundeck were twenty-four 30-pound short guns. On the quarterdeck and forecastle were a total of two 16 cm (6.3 in) rifled guns and eighteen 30-pounder carronades.

== Construction and career ==
Saint Louis had been laid down as a 90-gun 3rd-rank Suffren-class ship of the line on 13 July 1848 at the Arsenal de Brest under the name of Achille, but construction was suspended. The ship was renamed Saint Louis on 2 April 1850. Her incomplete hull was kept in a covered slipway until she was launched on 25 April 1854. The ship was commissioned on 20 May 1854 and completed in June. Saint Louis served as a troopship during the Crimean War. In July 1854, she ran aground at Kiel, Prussia. She was refloated on 26 July.

The ship's conversion into a steam-powered ship was ordered on 19 October 1854, although work did not begin until 25 April 1857 at the Arsenal de Cherbourg. Saint Louis was re-launched on 2 November 1857, recommissioned on 1 April 1858 and completed later that month. She bombed the Tétouan forts on 20 November 1859, and ferried troops in the French intervention in Mexico in 1862–1863. She was renamed Cacique in 1881 and served as a gunnery training ship, and was eventually broken up in 1895.
