= Commission de Paris =

Group of French naval engineers

The Commission de Paris was a body of French naval engineers gathered in 1821 to design the future frigates and ships of the line of the French Navy for the post-Empire era. Presided by Jacques-Noël Sané, the Commission comprised Jean-Marguerite Tupinier, Pierre Rolland, Pierre Lair and Jean Lamorinière.

The works of the Commission led to the design of double-decked 24-pounder frigates, as well as to four ranks of ships of the line: the 120-gun (Valmy being the lone unit built to the design), the 100-gun Hercule class, the 90-gun Suffren class, and an 80-gun type whose only ship ever started, Tour d’Auvergne, was never launched.

These ships of the line featured straight sides instead of the traditional tumblehome design that had prevailed until then; this tended to heighten the ships' centre of gravity, but provided much more room for equipment in the upper decks. Stability issues were fixed with underwater stabilisers. However, they proved difficult to build in a tight financial context; the resulting lengthy construction limited the useful lifetime of the ships, compounded with their quick obsolescence caused by the introduction of the Paixhans gun, steam engines and armour plating.

Ships designed by the Commission de Paris
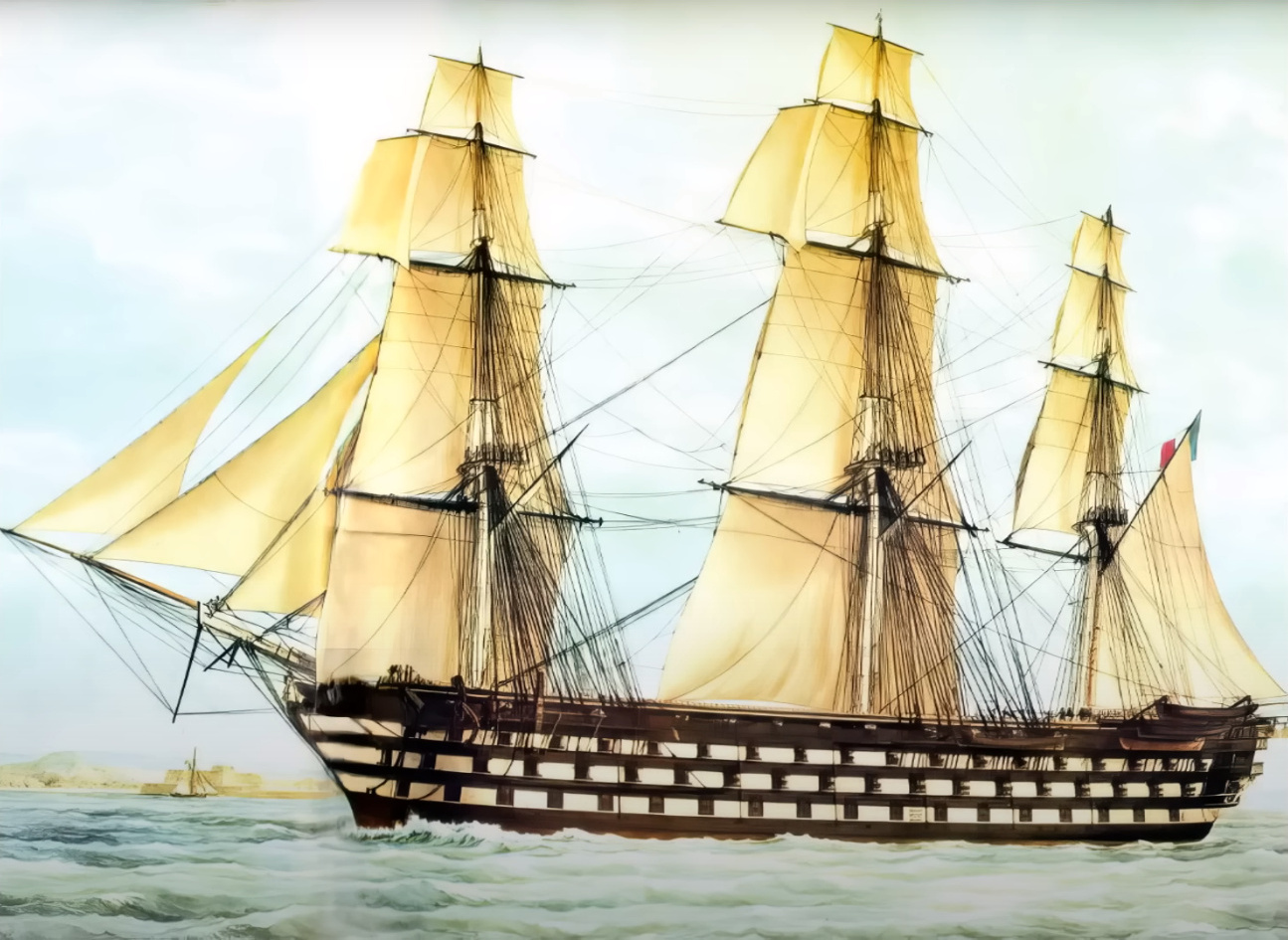
Valmy, the only 120-gun ship built to the Commission design, photographed after 1864 as the schoolship Borda.

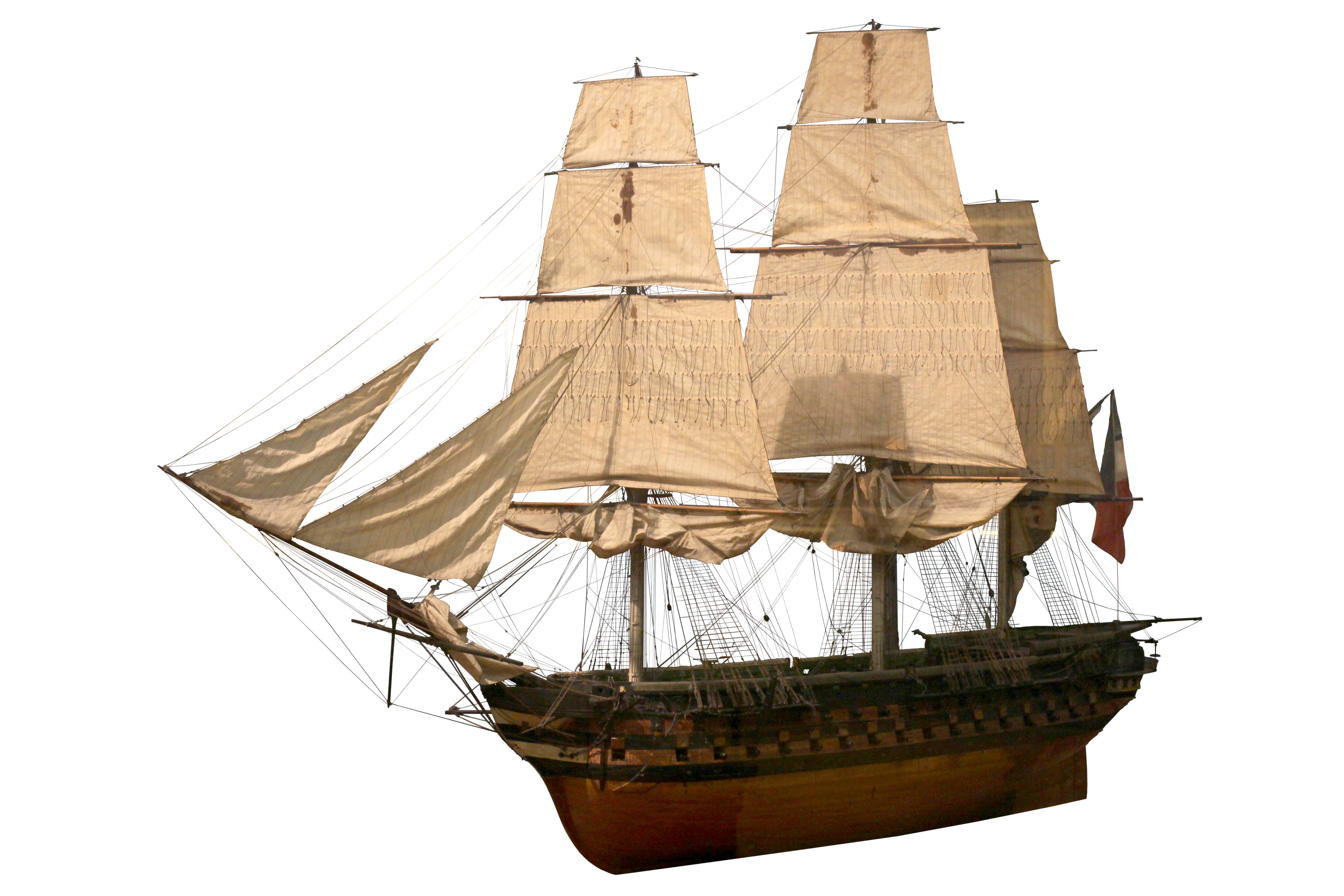
1/40-scale model of the 100-gun Hercule on display at the Musée national de la Marine.

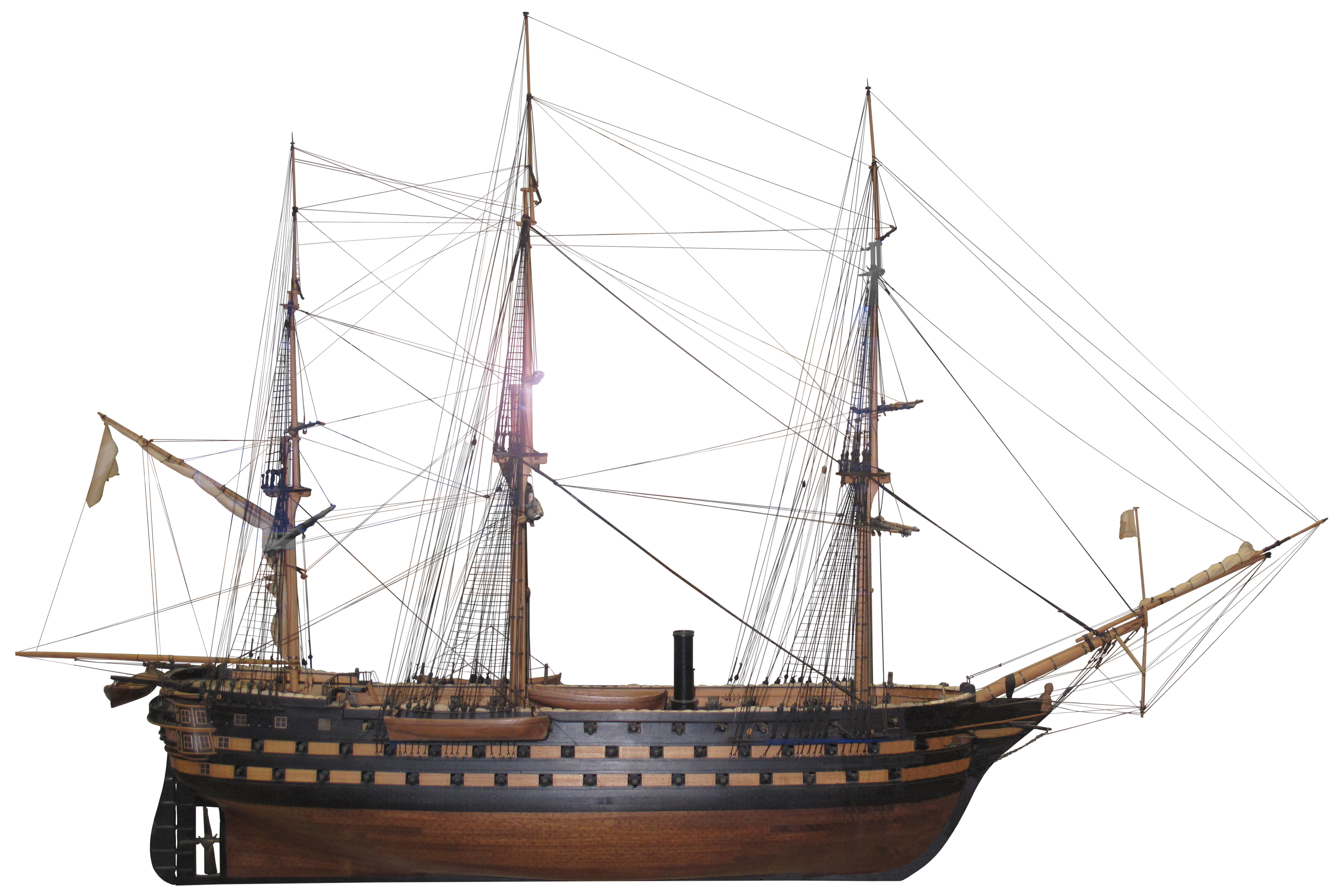
1/75-scale model of the 100-gun Prince Jérôme, on display at the Swiss Museum of Transport. She was transformed into a sail and steam ship of the line while on keel.

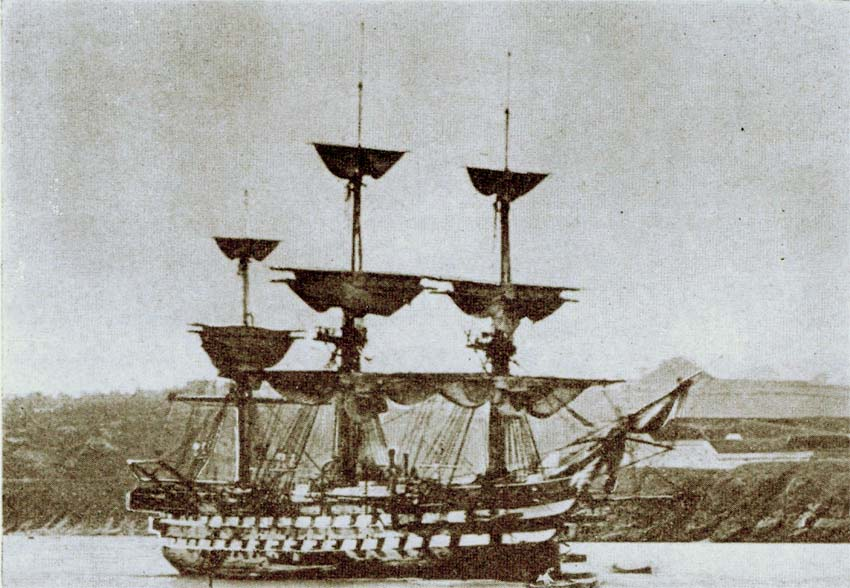
The 90-gun Inflexible as a boys' school

== History ==
During the First French Empire, the French Navy was organised into three types of ships of the line: the 118-gun three-deckers of the Océan class and their Commerce de Paris-class derivatives, which constituted the capital ships that led naval squadrons; the powerful 80-gun two-deckers of the Tonnant class and their Bucentaure-class derivatives, constituting the backbone of the squadrons; and the 74-gun workhorses of the Téméraire class. On the side of frigates, the design had stabilised on 18-pounder frigates of 44 guns, despite numerous attempts to increase the calibre of the main battery to 24-pounders as exemplified in particular by the Forte class.

In 1818, Portal d'Albarèdes was appointed Minister of the Navy of the recently restored Monarchy. In 1821, he gathered a Commission to prepare new designs for the ships of the French Navy.

In 1822, Tupinier published his Observations sur les dimensions des Vaisseaux et Frégates de la Marine française, recommending that the Océan class be retained as capital ship, and that two ranks of two-deckers be adopted: one carrying 102 guns, and the other 96. The number of capital ships needed was determined to be ten.

== Notes and references ==
=== Bibliography ===
- Boudriot, Jean (1995). Les vaisseaux de 74 à 120 canons : étude historique, 1650-1850. Paris: Éditions Ancre.
- Boudriot, Jean (1995). "Vaisseaux et frégates sous la Restauration et la Monarchie de Juillet". Marine et Technique au XIXe siècle. Paris: Éditions Ancre.
- Tupinier, Jean (1822). Observations sur les dimensions des Vaisseaux et Frégates de la Marine française. Paris.

=== External links ===
- Les vaisseaux de la commission de Paris (1824), Nicolas Mioque
