= Jean Boudriot =

French architect

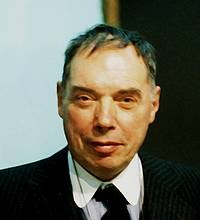
- Born: 20 March 1921
- Died: 22 February 2015 (aged 93)

Academic work
- Discipline: history architecture
- Sub-discipline: naval architecture
- Notable works: Le vaisseau de 74 canons

Jean Pierre Paul Boudriot (20 March 1921 in Dijon — 22 February 2015 in Paris) was a French naval architect and notable historian of weaponry and naval engineering.

Boudriot was one on the foremost instigators of the renaissance of naval archaeology and of arsenal modelism. He notably authored a 4-volume opus on 74-guns, Le vaisseau de 74 canons.

Born to a family of architects, Jean Boudriot started studying architecture.

In 1942, he started studying at Beaux-Arts, where he met his wife.

In 1943, he volunteered to work on a farm in Bourgogne to avoid STO forced work in Germany, and later in a schiste mine near Autun until May 1944.

After achieving an architecture diploma in 1947, Boudriot started working with three of his Beaux-Arts friends. He notably worked with Pierre Lejeune in Paris.
