= Suffren-class ship of the line =

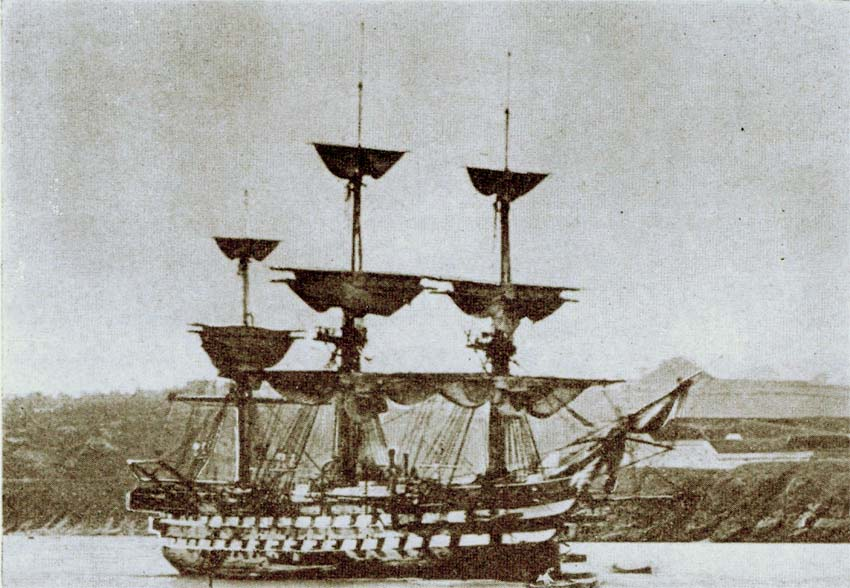
- Inflexible as a boys' school

Class overview
- Name: Suffren
- Builders: Toulon, Brest
- Operators: French Navy
- Preceded by: Bucentaure class ship of the line
- Succeeded by: Hercule class
- Completed: 14

General characteristics
- Class & type: Suffren class ship of the line
- Displacement: 4,070 tonnes
- Length: 60.50 metres
- Beam: 16.28 metres
- Draught: 7.40 metres
- Propulsion: 3,114 m^{2} of sails
- Complement: 810 to 846 men
- Armament: 1824-1839: 30 × 30-pounder long guns on lower deck; 32 × 30-pounder short guns on middle deck; 24 × 30-pounder carronades and 4 × 18-pounders on upper decks; 1839-1840; 26 × 30-pounder long guns and 4 × 22cm Paixhans guns on lower deck; 32 × 30-pounder short guns on middle deck; 24 × 30-pounder carronades and 4 × 16 cm Paixhans guns on upper decks
- Armour: 6.97 cm of timber

The Suffren class was a late type of 90-gun ships of the line of the French Navy.

The design was selected on 30 January 1824 by the Commission de Paris, an appointed Commission comprising Jean-Marguerite Tupinier, Jacques-Noël Sané, Pierre Rolland, Pierre Lair and Jean Lamorinière. Intended as successors of the 80-gun Bucentaure class and as the third of four ranks of ships of the line, they introduced the innovation of having straight walls, instead of the tumblehome design that had prevailed until then; this tended to heighten the ships' centre of gravity, but provided much more room for equipment in the upper decks. Stability issues were fixed with underwater stabilisers.

Only the first two, Suffren and Inflexible, retained the original design all through their career; the others were converted to steam and sail during their construction.

Design
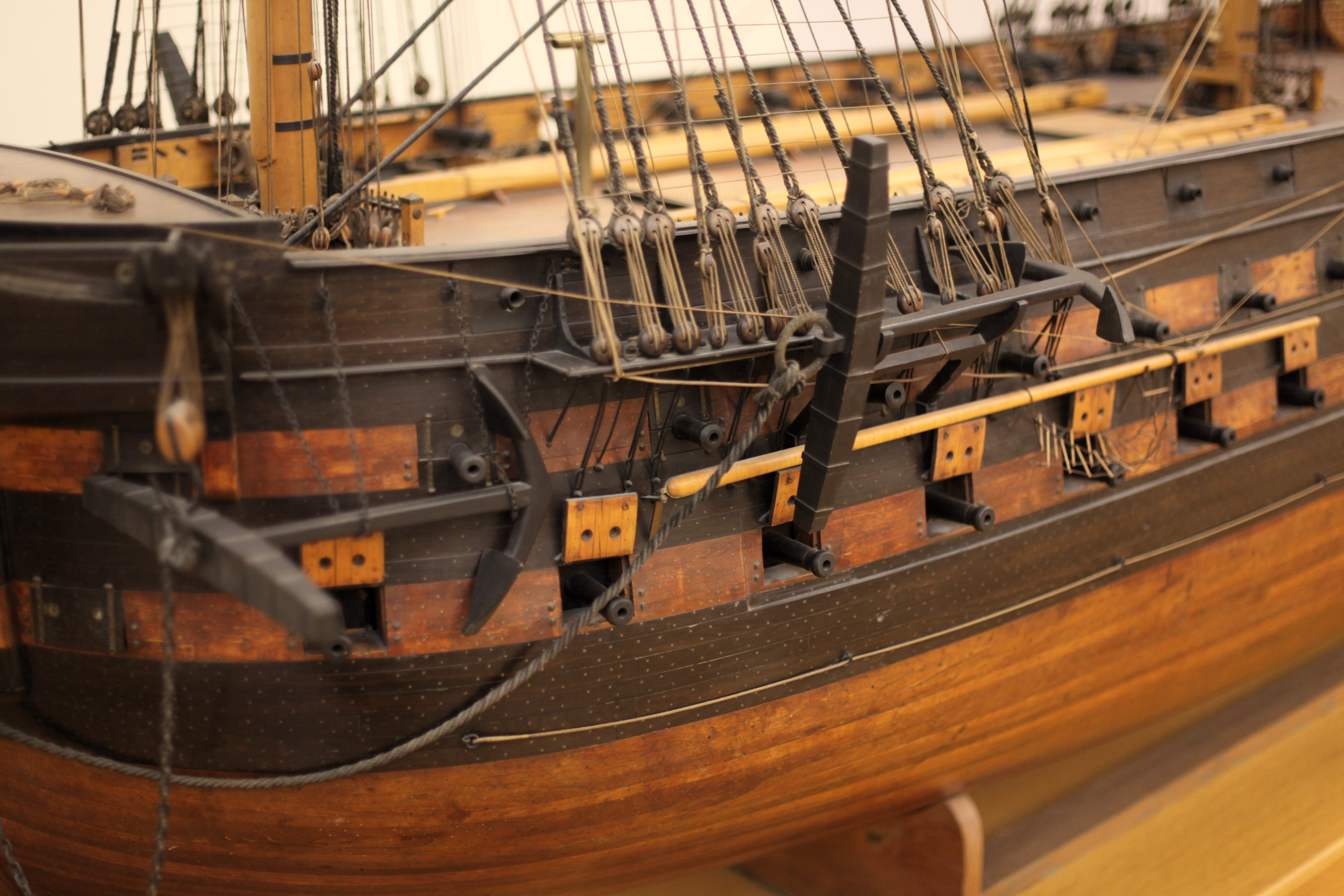
Straight walls of an arsenal model of Suffren, with the lower long 30-pounder battery, the upper short 30-pounder battery, and the 30-pounder carronades on the deck

== Ships ==
Fourteen ships were ordered to this design, of which twelve were modified as steam-driven vessels.

- Suffren

Builder: Cherbourg
Begun: August 1824
Launched: 27 August 1829
Completed: March 1831
Fate: Deleted February 1861, renamed Ajax in April 1865, and taken to pieces 1874-76.

- Inflexible

Builder: Rochefort
Begun: August 1827
Launched: 21 November 1839
Completed: August 1840
Fate: Condemned August 1875.

- Bayard

Builder: Lorient
Begun: July 1823
Launched: 28 August 1847
Completed: August 1849
Fate: Renamed Triton in August 1876

- Duguesclin

Builder: Rochefort
Begun: March 1823
Launched: 3 May 1848
Completed: August 1848
Fate: Wrecked 14 December 1859; refloated and taken to pieces in June 1860

- Breslaw

Builder: Brest
Begun: May 1827
Launched: 31 July 1848
Completed: 1849
Fate: Deleted in May 1871, renamed Breslau 1881 and taken to pieces 1886-87.

- Charlemagne

Builder: Toulon
Begun: April 1834
Launched: 16 January 1851
Completed: December 1851 (as steam screw ship)
Fate: Condemned in February 1882. Taken to pieces 1884

- Jean Bart

Builder: Lorient
Begun: 26 January 1849
Launched: 14 September 1852
Completed: April 1853 (as steam screw ship)
Fate: Renamed Donawerth in August 1868; sold or broken up in 1869

- Donawerth

Builder: Lorient
Begun: July 1827
Launched: 15 February 1854
Completed: July 1854
Fate:

- Tilsitt

Builder: Cherbourg
Begun: March 1832 as Diomède, renamed 23 November 1839
Launched: 30 March 1854
Completed: May 1854
Fate:

- Saint Louis

Builder: Brest
Begun: July 1848
Launched: 25 April 1854
Completed:
Fate:

- Alexandre

Builder: Rochefort
Begun:May 1848
Launched: 27 March 1857
Completed:
Fate:

- Fontenoy

Builder: Toulon
Begun: June 1827
Launched: 2 December 1858
Completed:
Fate:

- Masséna

Builder: Toulon
Begun: September 1835
Launched: 15 March 1860
Completed:
Fate:

- Castiglione

Builder: Toulon
Begun: October 1835
Launched: 14 July 1860
Completed:
Fate:
