= French ship Suffren (1829) =

Ship of the line of the French Navy

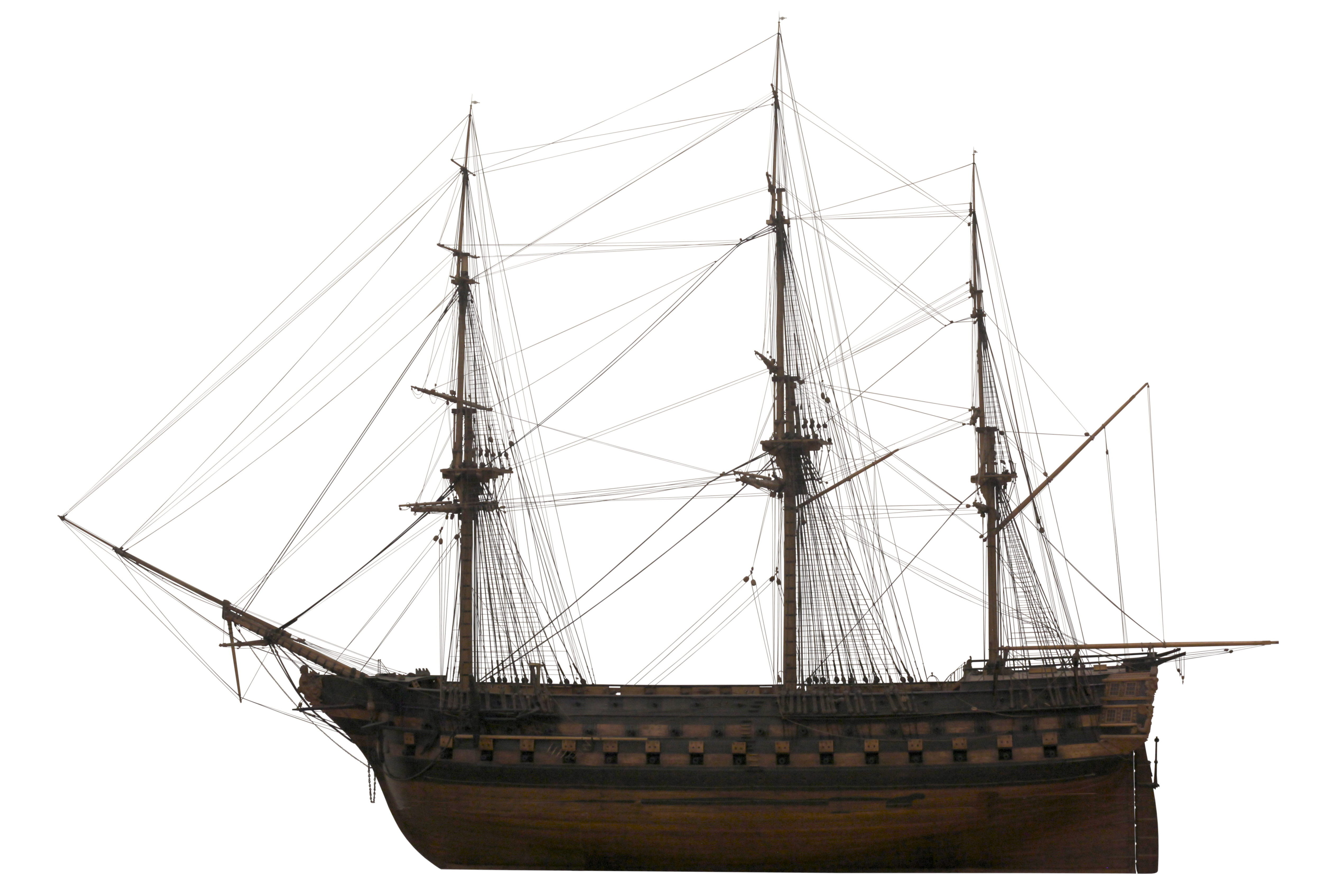
- 1/20th scale model on display at the Musée national de la Marine

History

France
- Namesake: Pierre André de Suffren de Saint Tropez
- Laid down: 21 August 1824
- Launched: 27 August 1829
- Commissioned: 10 March 1831
- Stricken: 4 April 1861
- Fate: Scrapped 1874

General characteristics
- Class & type: Suffren-class ship of the line
- Displacement: 4,070 tonnes
- Length: 60.50 m (198 ft 6 in)
- Beam: 16.28 m (53 ft 5 in)
- Draught: 7.40 m (24 ft 3 in)
- Propulsion: 3,114 m^{2} (33,520 sq ft) of sails
- Complement: 810 to 846 men
- Armament: 1824–1839: 30 × 30-pounder long guns on lower deck; 32 × 30-pounder short guns on middle deck; 24 × 30-pounder carronades and 4 × 18-pounders on upper decks; 1839–1840; 26 × 30-pounder long guns and 4 × 22cm Paixhans guns on lower deck; 32 × 30-pounder short guns on middle deck; 24 × 30-pounder carronades and 4 × 16 cm Paixhans guns on upper decks
- Armour: 6.97 cm (2.74 in) of timber

Suffren was a 90-gun ship of the line of the French Navy, lead ship of her class. She was the third ship in French service named in honour of Pierre André de Suffren de Saint Tropez.

== Career ==
The Suffren was the first ship of the line built with straight sides, after the specifications of the Commission de Paris, instead of the traditional tumblehome common on ships of the line.

She took part in the Battle of Tagus on 11 July 1831, under Captain Trotel, as Albin Roussin's flagship, and stayed off Lisbon for one month thereafter, leaving Portugal on 14 August.

The next year, she took part in the French Expedition to Ancona, on 22 February, ferrying 1500 infantrymen.

In 1838 she ran aground near Cádiz after a tempest. She was refloated by the steam ships Iéna and Phare.

She took part in the war against Morocco in August 1844, bombing Tangier on the 6 August and landing troops in Mogador on 16.

In 1854, Suffren was involved in the Crimean War. In July, an epidemic of cholera in the fleet in the Black Sea killed 20 and sickened 100 aboard. On 17 October, Suffren took part in the siege of Sevastopol.

The next year, she was converted to a troop ship. From 1857 to 1860, she was used as a gunnery school by the École Navale, before being stricken on 4 April 1861 and converted to a hulk. She was renamed Ajax on 8 April 1865, and scrapped in 1874.

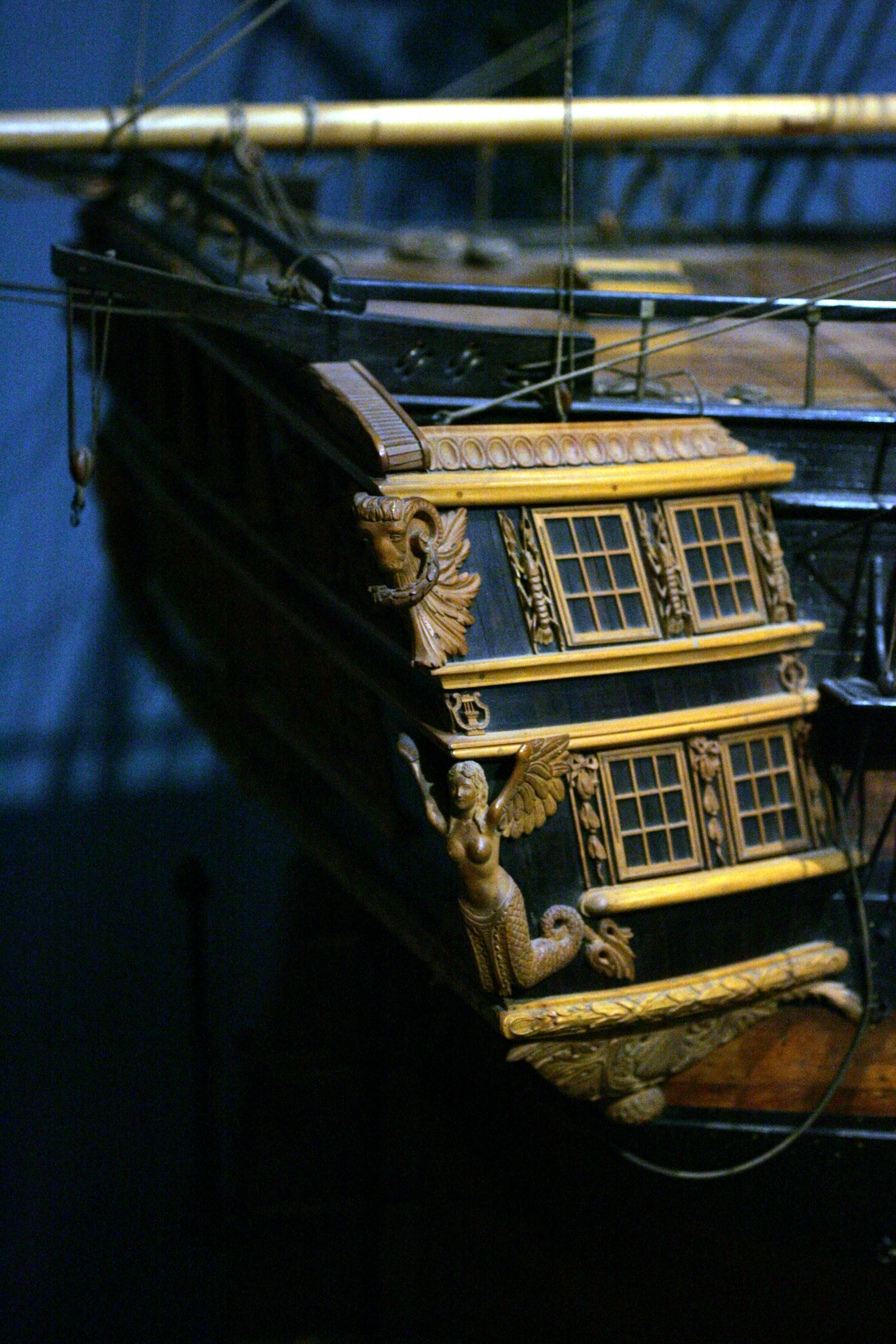

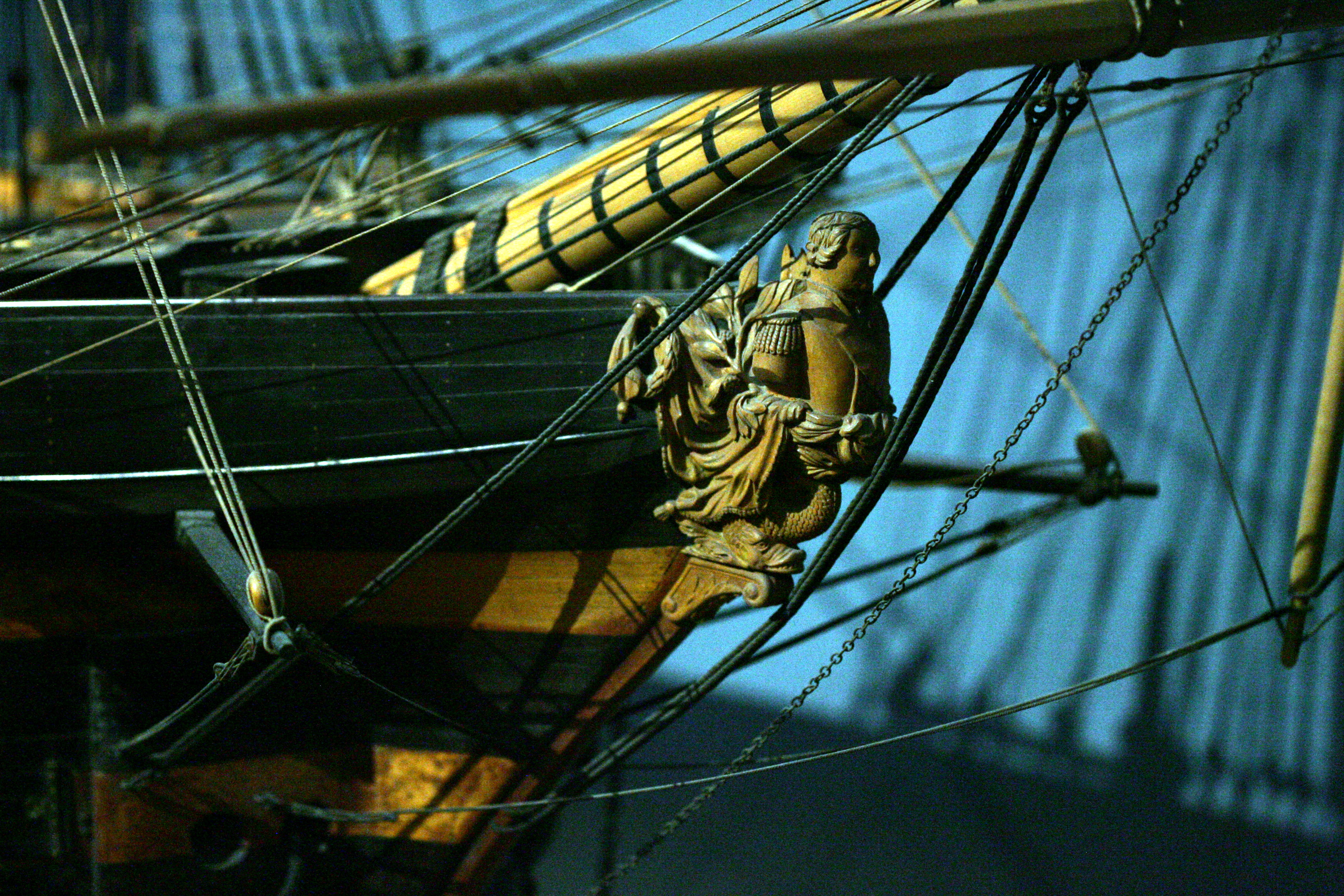
