= Stocks (shipyard) =

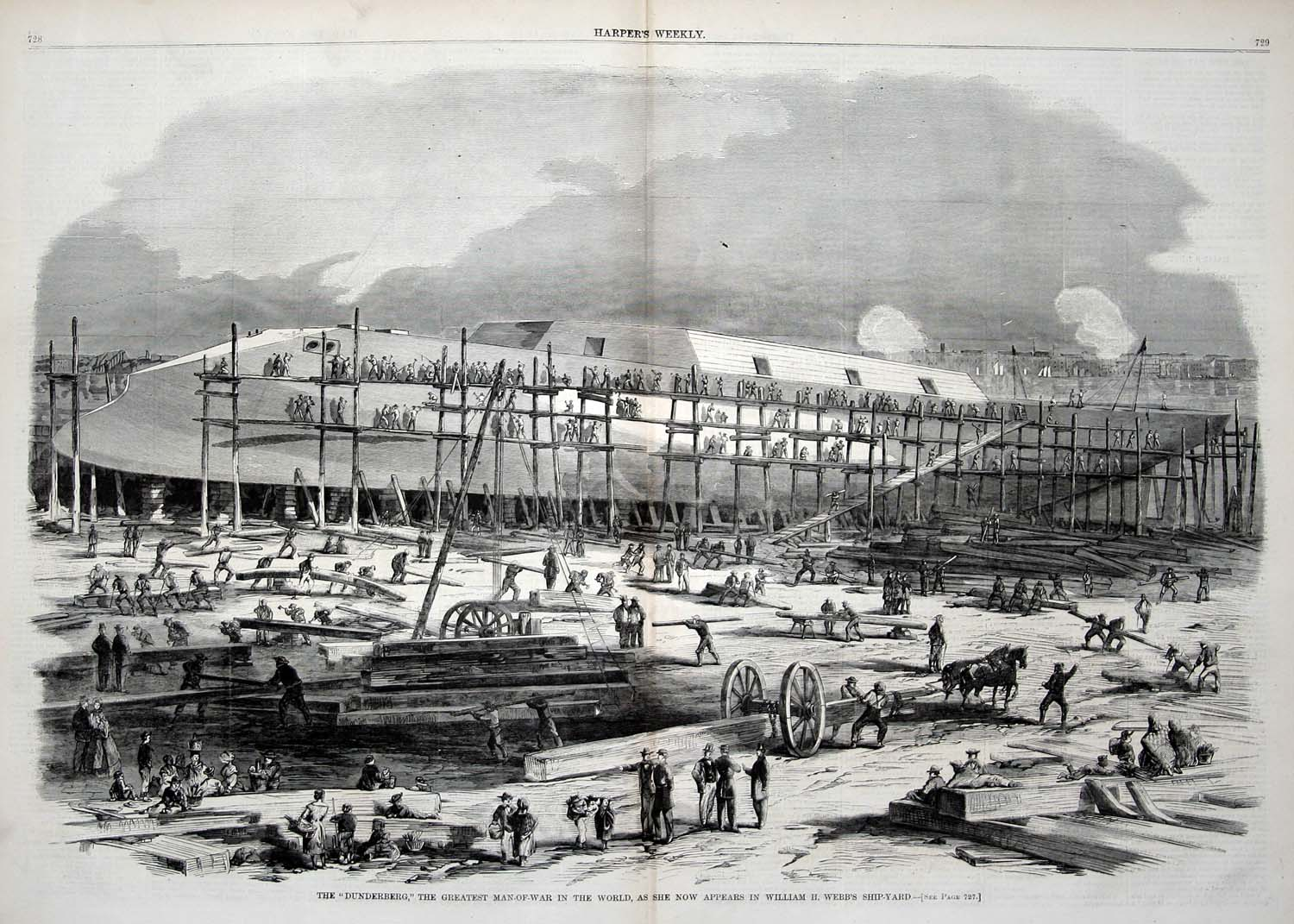
A lithograph showing the USS Dunderberg under construction during the American Civil War. The stocks are the external framework on which many workers can be seen.

Stocks are an external framework in a shipyard used to support construction of (usually) wooden ships. They are normally associated with a slipway to allow the ship to slide down into the water. In addition to supporting the ship itself, they are typically used to give access to the ship's bottom and sides. The availability and type of wood of the stocks in the yard would influence the nature and size of the ship that was built.

Stocks were commonly used until the late 19th century for shipbuilding with ships being referred to as built "on the stocks". Historical past examples that can still be seen include those still visible at the shore of Fishbourne, Isle of Wight in the United Kingdom.

== See also ==
- Scaffolding
