= 30-pounder long gun =

- 30-pounder without rigging.
- Type: naval gun
- Place of origin: France

Service history
- In service: 19th century
- Used by: French Navy
- Wars: Invasion of Algiers, Battle of the Tagus, Battle of Veracruz

Production history
- Manufacturer: Factories of Saint-Gervais, Nevers and Ruelle
- Unit cost: 1517.5 Francs

Specifications
- Mass: 3,035 kilograms (6,691 lb)
- Length: 315.8 centimetres (124.3 in)
- Barrel length: 282.9 centimetres (111.4 in)
- Calibre: 164.7 mm

The 30-pounder long gun was a large piece of artillery mounted on French warships of the Age of Sail. They were the heaviest component of the unified system standardised on the 30-pounder calibre, replacing both the 36-pounder long guns in their usages, and even some 24-pounders.

== Usage ==
Installed on the lower deck of the larger warships from the 1820s, the 30-pounder long gun was the largest caliber used in the late Navy of the Age of the Sail, used on the ships defined by the Commission de Paris. On three-deckers, the middle deck used 30-pounder short guns, and the upper deck used 30-pounder carronades. The flagship Bretagne was an exception to this rule, retaining the older 36-pounder long gun as to maximise the weight of her broadside.

== History ==
In the wake of the Napoleonic Wars, the French Navy undertook a number of reforms, most notably a reform in the artillery system. In contrast with the 1788 system, where large warships armed their main batteries with large 36-pounder long guns and upper deck with smaller long guns using smaller shots, it was decided to standardise on the 30-pound calibre, and deploy a variety of guns of different weights, as not to overload the tops. The differences in weight were obtained by fielding a large 30-pounder long gun, a shorter 30-pounder with a thinner barrel, and a 30-pounder carronade.

This allowed a much simplified handling of ammunition, and significantly increased the broadsides of warships. A first-rank 60-gun frigate of the 1840s thus armed had a heavier broadside than a 74-gun ship of the line of the 1780s.

== Sources and references ==
=== Bibliography ===
- Lafay, Jules Joseph (1850). Aide-mémoire d'artillerie navale. J. Corréard.
