= 30-pounder short gun =

19th-century French naval gun

- Type: naval gun
- Place of origin: France

Service history
- In service: 19th century
- Used by: French Navy
- Wars: Invasion of Algiers, Battle of the Tagus, Battle of Veracruz

Production history
- Unit cost: 1243.5 Francs

Specifications
- Mass: 2,487 kilograms (5,483 lb)
- Length: 291.9 centimetres (114.9 in)
- Barrel length: 235.0 centimetres (92.5 in)
- Calibre: 164.7 mm

The 30-pounder short gun was a piece of artillery mounted on French warships of the Age of Sail. They were the middle-sized component of the unified system standardised on the 30-pounder calibre, replacing both the 24-pounders and 18-pounders in many usages.

== Usage ==
The 30-pounder short gun was installed on the lower deck on frigates and on the middle deck of three-deckers, the main battery being armed with 30-pounder long guns and the upper deck, with 30-pounder carronades.

== History ==
In the wake of the Napoleonic Wars, the Navy undertook a number of reforms, most notably a reform in the artillery system. In contrast with the 1788 system, where large warships armed their main batteries with large 36-pounder long guns and upper deck with smaller long guns using smaller shots, it was decided to standardise on the 30-pound calibre, and deploy a variety of guns of different weights, as not to overload the tops. The differences in weight were obtained by fielding a large 30-pounder long gun, a shorter 30-pounder with a thinner barrel, and a 30-pounder carronade.

This allowed a much simplified handling of ammunition, and significantly increased the broadsides of warships. A first-rank 60-gun frigate of the 1840s thus armed had a heavier broadside than a 74-gun ship of the line of the 1780s.

== Sources and references ==
=== Bibliography ===
- Lafay, Jules Joseph (1850). Aide-mémoire d'artillerie navale. J. Corréard.
