= List of ship launches in 1856 =

The list of ship launches in 1856 includes a chronological list of some ships launched in 1856.

Date	Ship	Class	Builder	Location	Country	Notes
1 January	Moyola	Barque	Messrs. Alexander M'Laine & Sons	Belfast	United Kingdom	For Mr. Porter.
1 January	Widgeon	Schooner	James R. & George Steers	Williamsburg, New York	United States	For Daniel Edgar.
4 January	Lloyd Jones	Merchantman		Maesygarnedd	United Kingdom	For Lloyd Portmadoc.
5 January	John Temperley	Full-rigged ship	G. W. & W. J. Hall	Sunderland	United Kingdom	For Messrs. Hall & Temperley.
5 January	Sunshine	Clipper	Messrs. Hall	Aberdeen	United Kingdom	For Messrs. Harrison & Co.
8 January	Express	Steamship	Messrs. J. & G. Thompson	Govan	United Kingdom	For private owner.
8 January	Royal Mail	Steamship	Baillie Stangor	Stromness	United Kingdom	For private owner.
9 January	Georgiana	Schooner		Bombay	India	For British East India Company.
9 January	Mary Ann Wilson	Full-rigged ship	Messrs. Peile, Scott & Co.	Carlisle	United Kingdom	For John Sparks.
11 January	Mohawk	Vigilant-class gunvessel	Young, Magnay & Co	Limehouse	United Kingdom	For Royal Navy.
16 January	Cambrian Bell	Brig	John Evans	Aberystwyth	United Kingdom	For Richard Delahoyde.
19 January	Pioneer	Intrepid-class gunvessel		Pembroke Dockyard	United Kingdom	For Royal Navy.
22 January	Audacieuse	Ardente-class frigate		Brest	France	For French Navy.
24 January	Severn	Fourth rate		Chatham Dockyard	United Kingdom	For Royal Navy.
25 January	Victor Emmanuel	Full-rigged ship	Messrs. Barr & Shearer	Ardrossan	United Kingdom	For Messrs. Henry Moore & Co.
26 January	Lapwing	Vigilant-class gunvessel	Messrs. J. & R. White	West Cowes	United Kingdom	For Royal Navy.
29 January	Magnet	Albacore-class gunboat	W. Briggs & James Briggs	Low Southwick	United Kingdom	For Royal Navy.
29 January	Manly	Albacore-class gunboat		Sunderland	United Kingdom	For Royal Navy.
1 February	Violet	Albacore-class gunboat	Messrs. Green's	Blackwall	United Kingdom	For Royal Navy.
2 February	North American	Steamship	Messrs. William Denny & Bros.	Dumbarton	United Kingdom	For Montreal Ocean Steamship Company.
4 February	Demetrius	Steamship	John Pile Jr.	West Hartlepool	United Kingdom	For Messrs. Spartelli & Co.
6 February	Istamboul	Steamship	John Pile	West Hartlepool	United Kingdom	For Australian Auxiliary Steam Clipper Company.
8 February	Minniehaha	Yacht	George Tovill	The Hythe	United Kingdom	For John Mann.
9 February	Aladdin	Full-rigged ship	Messrs. Ritson & Co.	Maryport	United Kingdom	For John Aikin.
9 February	Kleimjee Oodhowjee	Full-rigged ship	J. Jones	Liverpool	United Kingdom	For Edward Bates.
9 February	Nettle	Cheerful-class gunboat		Pembroke Dockyard	United Kingdom	For Royal Navy.
9 February	Pet	Cheerful-class gunboat		Pembroke Dockyard	United Kingdom	For Royal Navy.
9 February	Sparrowhawk	Vigilant-class gunvessel	Young, Magnay & Co.	Limehouse	United Kingdom	For Royal Navy.
9 February	Star of Peace	Barque	Westcott	Barnstaple	United Kingdom	For private owner.
9 February	Two Brothers	Barque	Ballment	Barnstaple	United Kingdom	For private owner.
11 February	Beacon	Albacore-class gunboat	John Laird	Birkenhead	United Kingdom	For Royal Navy.
11 February	Brave	Albacore-class gunboat	John Laird	Birkenhead	United Kingdom	For Royal Navy.
13 February	Edgar Atheling	Merchantman	Messrs. T. Young & Sons	South Shields	United Kingdom	For private owner.
13 February	Sepoy	Albacore-class gunboat	T. & W. Smith	North Shields	United Kingdom	For Royal Navy.
16 February	Fervent	Albacore-class gunboat	Messrs. Green	Blackwall	United Kingdom	For Royal Navy.
16 February	Forester	Albacore-class gunboat	Messrs. Green	Blackwall	United Kingdom	For Royal Navy.
20 February	Eleanor	Brigantine	Messrs. Row	Topsham	United Kingdom	For William Sheppard.
21 February	Salacia	Snow	Edward Potts	Seaham	United Kingdom	For Dent& Lawson.
22 February	Ringdove	Vigilant-class gunvessel	J. & R. White	Cowes	United Kingdom	For Royal Navy.
22 February	Siegmund Robinow	Steamship	Messrs. Caird & Co.	Greenock	United Kingdom	For Messrs. H. Seligmann & William Connal.
23 February	Brazen	Albacore-class gunboat	John Laird	Liverpool	United Kingdom	For Royal Navy.
23 February	Blazer	Albacore-class gunboat	John Laird	Liverpool	United Kingdom	For Royal Navy.
3 February	Florence	Medium clipper	Samuel Hall	East Boston, Massachusetts	United States	For J. M. Forbes, R. B. Forbes and Philip Dumarescq.
25 February	Bullfinch	Albacore-class gunboat	John Laird	Birkenhead	United Kingdom	For Royal Navy.
23 February	Eupatoria	Collier	Messrs. C. Mitchell & Co.	Low Walker	United Kingdom	For General Screw Collier Company.
23 February	Paris	Passenger ship	Messrs. C. Mitchell & Co.	Low Walker	United Kingdom	For private owner.
23 February	Unnamed	Steam yacht	Messrs. C. Mitchell & Co.	Low Walker	United Kingdom	For George Bidder.
28 February	Opossom	Albacore-class gunboat	Messrs. Wigram & Son	Northam	United Kingdom	For Royal Navy.
28 February	Tasmanian Maid	Paddle steamer	Richardson, Duck and Company	Stockton-on-Tees	United Kingdom	For F. A Ducroz.
February	Crocodile	Brig	Kelly	Sandhurst	United Kingdom	For private owner.
February	Lively	Albacore-class gunboat	Messrs. T. & W. Smith	North Shields	United Kingdom	For Royal Navy.
February	Spider	Albacore-class gunboat	Messrs. T. & W. Smith	North Shields	United Kingdom	For Royal Navy.
1 March	Hardy	Albacore-class gunboat	Charles Hill & Sons	Bristol	United Kingdom	For Royal Navy.
1 March	Orpheus	Medium clipper	Rice & Mitchell	Chelsea, Massachusetts	United States	For W. F. Weld & Co.
4 March	Waldensian	Steamship	Scotts Shipbuilding and Engineering Company	Greenock	United Kingdom	For Rennie Line.
6 March	Catherine Maria	Schooner		Rhuddlan	United Kingdom	For Edward Roberts.
6 March	Inca	Paddle steamer	Messrs. Robert Steele & Co.	Greenock	United Kingdom	For Pacific Steam Navigation Co.
6 March	Opossum	Albacore-class gunboat	Messrs. Wigram & Sons	Southampton	United Kingdom	For Royal Navy.
6 March	Surprise	Vigilant-class gunvessel	Money Wigram & Sons	Blackwall Yard	United Kingdom	For Royal Navy.
7 March	City of Quebec	Full-rigged ship	Messrs. Duthie & Cochar	Montrose	United Kingdom	For Messrs. Donaldson, Rose & Co.
7 March	The Fleetwood	Schooner	Messrs. S. Hope & Co.	Fleetwood	United Kingdom	For private owner.
7 March	Ziska	Schooner	John Roberts	Holyhead	United Kingdom	For Mr. Glynne.
8 March	Angler	Cheerful-class gunboat		Devonport Dockyard	United Kingdom	For Royal Navy.
8 March	Beyrout	Steamship	Messrs. T. & W. Smith	North Shields	United Kingdom	For private owner.
8 March	Drake	Clown-class gunboat		Pembroke Dockyard	United Kingdom	For Royal Navy.
8 March	Eliza Bond	Schooner	William Bishton	Chester	United Kingdom	For Messrs. Roper & Co.
8 March	Emigrant	Barque	Charles Birnie	Montrose	United Kingdom	For Charles Birnie.
8 March	Fury	Tug		Liverpool	United Kingdom	For Steam Tug Company.
8 March	Janus	Clown-class gunboat		Pembroke Dockyard	United Kingdom	For Royal Navy.
8 March	Neville	Full-rigged ship	William Stephen	Arbroath	United Kingdom	For Messrs. Woods, Spence & Co.
11 March	Redbreast	Albacore-class gunboat	John Laird	Birkenhead	United Kingdom	For Royal Navy.
12 March	Prince Eugene of Savoy	Steamship		Venice	Austrian Empire	For Austrian Navy.
14 March	Cormorant	Gunboat	Messrs. Fletcher's	Woolwich	United Kingdom	For Royal Navy.
15 March	Drake	Clown-class gunboat		Pembroke Dockyard	United Kingdom	For Royal Navy.
15 March	Janus	Clown-class gunboat		Pembroke Dockyard	United Kingdom	For Royal Navy.
18 March	Alarm	Clipper	E. & H. O. Briggs	Boston, Massachusetts	United States	For Baker & Morill.
18 March	Surly	Albacore-class gunboat	T. & W. Smith	Newcastle upon Tyne	United Kingdom	For Royal Navy.
20 March	Alacrity	Despatch vessel	Messrs. C. J. Mare & Co.	Blackwall	United Kingdom	For Royal Navy.
20 March	Havock	Albarcore-class gunboat	Messrs. Hill & Sons	Bristol	United Kingdom	For Royal Navy.
20 March	Vigilance	Despatch vessel	Messrs. C. J. Mare & Co.	Blackwall	United Kingdom	For Royal Navy.
21 March	City of Delhi	Clipper	Messrs. Robert Steele & Co.	Greenock	United Kingdom	For Messrs. Georges Smith & Sons.
22 March	Ant	Cheerful-class gunboat		Devonport Dockyard	United Kingdom	For Royal Navy.
22 March	Austral	Clipper	Messrs. A. Duthie & Co.	Aberdeen	United Kingdom	For private owners.
22 March	Elizabeth	Paddle Steamer	Redhead	Birkenhead	United Kingdom	For J. Demantino.
22 March	Roebuck	Intrepid-class gunboat	Messrs. John Scott Russell & Co.	Millwall	United Kingdom	For Royal Navy.
22 March	Spanker	Albacore-class gunboat			United Kingdom	For Royal Navy.
22 March	Thrasher	Albacore-class gunboat			United Kingdom	For Royal Navy.
24 March	Napoleon	Steamship	Messrs. Samuelson	Hull	United Kingdom	For French-Anglo Steam Navigation Company.
25 March	Procris	Gunboat	Pitcher	Northfleet	United Kingdom	For Royal Navy.
27 March	Charity	Brigantine	M. Pearson	River Ouse	United Kingdom	For private owner.
29 March	Earnest	Albacore-class gunboat	William Patterson	Bristol	United Kingdom	For Royal Navy.
29 March	Edward Whitley	Mersey flat	Brundrit & Whiteway	Runcorn	United Kingdom	For William Griffith.
29 March	Grappler	Albacore-class gunboat	Money Wigram & Sons	Blackwall	United Kingdom	For Royal Navy.
March	Annie	Brigantine	Owen	Teignmouth	United Kingdom	For private owner.
March	Delight	Albacore-class gunboat	Messrs. Ingram's	Blackwall	United Kingdom	For Royal Navy.
March	Sydney Jones	Schooner	William Griffiths	Port Madoc	United Kingdom	For private owner.
3 April	Albacore	Albacore-class gunboat	Messrs. John & Robert White	Cowes	United Kingdom	For Royal Navy.
3 April	Astræa	Schooner	Messrs. John Reid & Co.	Port Glasgow	United Kingdom	For Messrs. Joseph Heap & Sons.
3 April	Min	Steamship	Messr. William Denny & Bros.	Dumbarton	United Kingdom	For private owner.
3 April	Onyx	Cheerful-class gunboat	Messrs. Young, Son & Magnay	Limehouse	United Kingdom	For Royal Navy.
3 April	Pert	Cheerful-class gunboat	Messrs. Young, Son, & Magnay	Limehouse	United Kingdom	For Royal Navy.
5 April	Aetna	Aetna-class ironclad floating battery		Chatham Dockyard	United Kingdom	For Royal Navy.
5 April	Auchneagh	Merchantman		Greenock	United Kingdom	For private owner
5 April	Genova	Passenger ship	Messrs. C. J. Mare & Co.	Blackwall	United Kingdom	For Genoese Transatlantic Steam Packet Company.
5 April	Havre	Paddle steamer	Messrs. C. J. Mare & Co.	Blackwall	United Kingdom	For London and South Western Railway.
5 April	Marion	Schooner	John Roberts	Hirael	United Kingdom	For private owner.
5 April	Kittywake	Clipper	Messrs. Hall	Aberdeen	United Kingdom	For Marquis of Ailsa.
5 April	The Peveril of the Peak	Merchantman	Messrs. P. C. Chaloner, Sons, & Co.	Liverpool	United Kingdom	For Messrs. Barnes, Brookes & Co.
6 April	Black Prince	Medium clipper	George W. Jackman	Newburyport, Massachusetts	United States	For Bush & Wildes.
7 April	Adriatic	Steamship	George Steers	New York	United States	For Collins Line.
7 April	Corriemulzie	Clipper	Messrs. Calman & Martin	Dundee	United Kingdom	For Isaac Cruickshank.
7 April	Fidget	Cheerful-class gunboat	Victoria Foundry Company	Greenwich	United Kingdom	For Royal Navy.
7 April	London	Steamship	Messrs. Gourlay Bros.	Dundee	United Kingdom	For Dundee, Perth, and London Shipping Company.
7 April	Red Rover	Yacht		Spalding	United Kingdom	For H. Bugg
7 April	Spey	Albacore-class gunboat	Messrs. Pitcher's	Northfleet	United Kingdom	For Royal Navy.
7 April	Tilbury	Albacore-class gunboat	Messrs. Pitcher's	Northfleet	United Kingdom	For Royal Navy.
7 April	Victor Emmanuel	Steamship	Victoria Foundry Company	Greewich	United Kingdom	For private owner.
19 April	Erebus	Erebus-class ironclad floating battery	Messrs. Robert Napier & Sons	Govan	United Kingdom	For Royal Navy.
21 April	Blossom	Cheerful-class gunboat	John Laird	Birkenhead	United Kingdom	For Royal Navy.
21 April	Gadfly	Cheerful-class gunboat	John Laird	Birkenhead	United Kingdom	For Royal Navy.
21 April	Nimrod	Despatch vessel	Scott Russell & Co	Millwall	United Kingdom	For Royal Navy.
21 April	Rocket	Albacore-class gunboat	John Laird	Liverpool	United Kingdom	For Royal Navy.
21 April	Rose	Albacore-class gunboat	John Laird	Liverpool	United Kingdom	For Royal Navy.
22 April	Lady Londesborough	Merchantman	Parkinson	Hull	United Kingdom	For William Standering.
22 April	Margaret Porter	Schooner	M. Simpson	Lancaster	United Kingdom	For private owner.
22 April	Thunderbolt	Floating battery	Messrs. Samuda Bros.	Millwall	United Kingdom	For Royal Navy.
22 April	Trent	Steamship	Messrs. Martin Samuelson & Co.	Hull	United Kingdom	For private owner.
23 April	Lord Rollo	Schooner	Messrs. Fenton & Smeaton	Perth	United Kingdom	For private owner.
23 April	Reynard	Vigilant-class gunvessel	Messrs. Mare's	Blackwall, London	United Kingdom	For Royal Navy.
24 April	Terror	Floating battery	Messrs. Palmer Brothers	Jarrow	United Kingdom	For Royal Navy.
26 April	Neva	Steamship	Messr. Earle's	Hull	United Kingdom	For private owner.
26 April	William France	Steamship	Messrs. J. W. Hoby & Co.	Renfrew	United Kingdom	For William France.
29 April	Highlander	Albacore-class gunboat	Messrs. Hill & Sons	Bristol	United Kingdom	For Royal Navy.
April	Anglo Saxon	Steamship	William Denny and Brothers	Dumbarton	United Kingdom	For Montreal Ocean Steamship Company.
April	Expounder	Medium clipper	Joshua Magoun	Charlestown, Massachusetts	United States	For Paul Sears.
April	Haberdine	Schooner	Mansfield	Teignmouth	United Kingdom	For private owner.
April	Minniehaha	Full-rigged ship	Donald McKay	East Boston, Massachusetts	United States	For private owner.
April	Peacock	Albacore-class gunboat	Messrs. Pitcher's	Northfleet	United Kingdom	For Royal Navy.
April	Xiphias	Barque		Saint John	(United Kingdom of Great Britain and Ireland) Colony of New Brunswick	For private owner.
3 May	Camel	Albacore-class gunboat		Deptford Dockyard	United Kingdom	For Royal Navy.
3 May	Druid	Steamship	Messrs. Tod & MacGregor	Partick	United Kingdom	For Cambria Company.
3 May	Jane Lacy	Barque	Stonehouse	Sunderland	United Kingdom	For Mr. Lacy.
5 May	Anne Cropton	Barque	John Robinson	Deptford	United Kingdom	For Thomas Cropton.
5 May	Sea Breeze	Full-rigged ship	Messrs. Briggs & Sons	Pallion	United Kingdom	For Miles & Kingston.
6 May	Alnwick Castle	Full-rigged ship	William Pile Jr.	Sunderland	United Kingdom	For R. Green.
6 May	Canute	Schooner	John Vernon	Low Walker	United Kingdom	For Messrs. Hunter & Erichsen.
6 May	Henry and Ellen	Schooner	Thomas Smith	Marsh End	United Kingdom	For James Ashcroft.
6 May	Liffey	Liffey-class frigate		Devonport Dockyard	United Kingdom	For Royal Navy.
6 May	Lochiel	Clipper	Messrs. George Milne & Co.	Aberdeen	United Kingdom	For private owner.
6 May	Robert Adamson	Brig	Messrs. Green, Robinson & Co	Hylton	United Kingdom	For Mr. Adamson.
6 May	Wave of Life	Clipper	Messrs. Walter Hood & Co.	Aberdeen	United Kingdom	For Aberdeen Clipper Line.
6 May	Unnamed	Barque	Thompson	Southwick	United Kingdom	For private owner.
7 May	Charlotte	Schooner		Bombay	India	For British East India Company.
7 May	Lord Clarendon	Brig	Messrs. Sykes & Co.	North Hylton	United Kingdom	For R. L. Barnett.
8 May	Midge	Cheerful-class gunboat	Messrs. Curling & Young	Limehouse	United Kingdom	For Royal Navy.
8 May	Tiny	Cheerful-class gunboat	Messrs. Curling & Young	Limehouse	United Kingdom	For Royal Navy.
12 May	Kyle Spangler	Schooner	William Jones	Black River, Ohio	United States	For B. L Spangler Company.
15 May	Eylau	Hercule-class ship of the line	Arsenal de Toulon	Toulon	France	For French Navy
19 May	Amelia	Albacore-class gunboat	Messrs. John & Robert White	Cowess	United Kingdom	For Royal Navy.
19 May	Dundrenna	Barque	Willimett	River Usk	United Kingdom	For J. N. Knapp.
20 May	Alert	Cruizer-class sloop		Pembroke Dockyard	United Kingdom	For Royal Navy
20 May	Cadmus	Pearl-class corvette		Chatham Dockyard	United Kingdom	For Royal Navy.
20 May	Lancastria	Barque	Richard Wilkinson	Pallion	United Kingdom	For John Longton.
21 May	Delta	Passenger ship	Day, Summers and Company	Northam	United Kingdom	For Peninsular and Oriental Steam Navigation Company.
21 May	Frolic	Steam yacht	Messrs. Martin Samuelson & Co.	Hull	United Kingdom	For Martin Samuelson.
21 May	Sephora	Steamship	Messrs. Martin Samuelson & Co.	Hull	United Kingdom	For private owner.
22 May	Aurora	Steamship	Messrs. Robinson & Co.	Cork	United Kingdom	For private owner.
22 May	Union	Brigantine	James Mucklejohn		(United Kingdom of Great Britain and Ireland) Colony of Prince Edward Island	For James Mucklejohn.
22 May	Vivandiere	Steamship	Messrs. William Simons & Co'	Whiteinch	United Kingdom	For private owners.
24 May	Pheasant	Albacore-class gunboat	Messrs. Pitcher's	Northfleet	United Kingdom	For Royal Navy.
24 May	Primrose	Albacore-class gunboat	Messrs. Pitcher's	Northfleet	United Kingdom	For Royal Navy.
26 May	Clown	Clown-class gunboat	William Cowley Miller	Toxteth	United Kingdom	For Royal Navy.
26 May	Escort	Albacore-class gunboat	Messrs. Patterson & Son	Bristol	United Kingdom	For Royal Navy.
26 May	Kestrel	Clown-class gunboat	William Cowley Miller	Toxteth	United Kingdom	For Royal Navy.
31 May	Pickle	Albacore-class gunboat	Messrs. Pitcher's	Northfleet	United Kingdom	For Royal Navy.
May	Strathmore	Merchantman			United Kingdom	For Alex Fotheringham and Richard Young.
2 June	Quail	Albacore-class gunboat	Messrs. Wigram's	Blackwall	United Kingdom	For Royal Navy.
2 June	Ripple	Albacore-class gunboat	Messrs. Wigram's	Blackwall	United Kingdom	For Royal Navy.
3 June	Sir John Moore	Full-rigged ship	J. Rodgerson	Sunderland	United Kingdom	For Neil Mathieson.
3 June	Three Swans	Cutter yacht	George Marshall	Dublin	United Kingdom	For private owner.
4 June	Agnes	Brig	Messrs. Duthie	Footdee	United Kingdom	For Mr. Forbes and others.
4 June	Isabella & Mary	Brig	Messrs. Sanderson & Leighton	Amble	United Kingdom	For Messrs. Heatley & Gibb.
4 June	Lucien	Steamship	Messrs. M. Samuelson & Co.	Hull	United Kingdom	For Anglo-French Steam Ship Company.
4 June	Sovereign	Steamship	Messrs. Thomas Vernon & Sons	Liverpool	United Kingdom	For Liverpool and Bristol Channel Steamship Company.
4 June	Watchful	Clown-class gunboat	Messrs. Smith	North Shields	United Kingdom	For Royal Navy.
6 June	Woodcock	Clown-class gunboat	Messrs. Smith	North Shields	United Kingdom	For Royal Navy.
7 June	Flirt	Cheerful-class gunboat	Messrs. Joyce	Greenwich	United Kingdom	For Royal Navy.
7 June	Fernando el Catolico	Steamship	Messrs. Joyce	Greenwich	United Kingdom	For private owner.
18 June	Golden Fleece	Clipper	Messrs. Walter Hood & Co.	Aberdeen	United Kingdom	For private owner.
18 June	Oithona	Cutter yacht	Messrs. Fyfe's	Fairlie	United Kingdom	For J. M. Rowan.
18 June	Rhone	Steamship	Messrs. Scott & Co.	Greenock	United Kingdom	For private owner.
19 June	Colorado	Frigate		Norfolk Navy Yard	United States	For United States Navy.
19 June	George Canning	Clipper	Thomas Wright	Aberdeebn	United Kingdom	For private owner.
19 June	Scylla	Pearl-class corvette		Sheerness Dockyard	United Kingdom	For Royal Navy.
21 June	Margarets	Schooner	Scorgie	Aberdeen	United Kingdom	For private owners.
25 June	Brisbane	Paddle steamer	Messrs. J. & G. Thompson	Govan	United Kingdom	For Australasian Steam Navigation Company.
27 June	Malacho	Steamship	Messrs. Scott & Co.	Greenock	United Kingdom	For private owner.
June	Archibald Glen	Barque		New Glasgow	(United Kingdom of Great Britain and Ireland) Colony of Nova Scotia	For private owner.
June	Fruiter	Schooner	Kelly	Dartmouth	United Kingdom	For private owner.
2 July	Earl of Clarendon	Schooner	John Duncan	Speymouth	United Kingdom	For private owner.
3 July	Cordelia	Racer-class sloop		Pembroke Dockyard	United Kingdom	For Royal Navy.
3 July	Emma	Steamship	Messrs. Samuelson	Hul	United Kingdom	For private owner.
3 July	Margaret Edward	Barque	John Duncan	Speymouth	United Kingdom	For private owner.
3 July	Margaret Taylor	Barque	James Geddie	Kingston-upon-Spey	United Kingdom	For private owners.
3 July	The Rapid	Steamship	Messrs. S. & H. Morton	Leith	United Kingdom	For London and Edinburgh Shipping Company.
4 July	Merrie England	Full-rigged ship	Albert White	Waterford	United Kingdom	For James Beazley.
15 July	Taurus	Steamship	Messrs. William Simmons & Co.	Whiteinch	United Kingdom	For private owner.
17 July	Governor Higginson	Steamship	Messrs. J. & G. Thomson	Govan	United Kingdom	For private owner.
17 July	Gyrn Castle	Full-rigged ship	Belfast Shipbuilding Company	Belfast	United Kingdom	For E. Bates.
18 July	Circassian	Steamship	Messrs. Robert Hickson & Co.	Belfast	United Kingdom	For private owner.
18 July	Emerald	Frigate		Deptford Dockyard	United Kingdom	For Royal Navy.
19 July	Enterprise	Paddle steamer	Messrs. T. and W. Smith	North Shields	United Kingdom	For Dundalk and Midland Steam Packet Company.
24 July	Heimdal	Corvette		Nyholm	Denmark	For Royal Danish Navy.
25 July	Persia	Ocean liner	Robert Napier and Sons	Glasgow	United Kingdom	For Cunard Line.
31 July	Jona	Steamship	T. D. Marshall	South Shields	United Kingdom	For private owner.
31 July	Sea Horse	Steamship		Kingston upon Hull	United Kingdom	For private owner.
July	Arabell	Brigantine		Digby	(United Kingdom of Great Britain and Ireland) Colony of Nova Scotia	For private owner.
July	Hebe	Schooner		Digby	(United Kingdom of Great Britain and Ireland) Colony of Nova Scotia	For private owner.
July	Isabella	Tug		North Shields	United Kingdom	For Mr. Murray.
July	Undine	Steam yacht	Messrs. Scott, Russell & Co	Millwall	United Kingdom	For Duke of Sutherland.
July	Vigilante	Schooner		Isigny-sur-Mer	France	For use as a floating church.
2 August	Balaklava	Steamship	Messrs. Palmer Bros.	Newcastle upon Tyne	United Kingdom	For British Government.
2 August	Dorothy	Full-rigged ship	Messrs. Hall	Aberdeen	United Kingdom	For Messrs. Charles Horsfall & Sons.
2 August	Emmeline	Steamship	Messrs. Samuelson	Hull	United Kingdom	For Messrs. Z. C. Pearson, Coleman, & Co.
2 August	Grange	Steamship	Messrs. J. & G. Thomson	Govan	United Kingdom	For Carron Company.
2 August	Maid of the Tyne	Barque	Bowman and Drummond	Blyth	United Kingdom	For John Dryden.
2 August	San Dionisio	Steamship	Victoria Foundry Company	Greenwich	United Kingdom	For private owner.
4 August	Alexander II	Steamship	Messrs. Blackwood & Gordon	Gartvale	United Kingdom	For private owner.
4 August	British Lion	Merchantman	Messrs. Cunningham	Newcastle upon Tyne	United Kingdom	For Mr. Avery.
4 August	Ravensworth	Merchantman	Messrs. Gaddy & Lamb	Newcastle upon Tyne	United Kingdom	For R. W. Hodgson.
4 August	Teutonia	Steamship	Caird & Company	Greenock	United Kingdom	For Hamburg Brazilianische Packetschiffahrt Gesellschaft.
15 August	Impératrice Eugénie	Frigate		Toulon	France	For French Navy.
15 August	Impétueuse	Frigate		Cherbourg	France	For French Navy.
16 August	Dalhousie	Merchantman		Methil	United Kingdom	For private owner.
18 August	General Williams	Steamship	Messrs. Lesley	Hebburn	United Kingdom	For private owner.
18 August	Gosforth	Merchantman	Messrs. Smith	North Shields	United Kingdom	For private owner.
18 August	Selma	Barque	Messrs. A. & R. Hopper	Newcastle upon Tyne	United Kingdom	For Mark Thompson.
19 August	Moscow	Steamship	Messrs. Palmer Bros.	Newcastle upon Tyne	United Kingdom	For Messrs. De Jersey & Co.
19 August	Nauphante	Barque	W. C. Miller	Toxteth	United Kingdom	For Messrs. Cotesworth, Wynne, & Lyne.
19 August	Spitfire	Barque	Messrs. George Robinson & Co.	Cork	United Kingdom	For private owner.
19 August	Thomas Daniel	Barque	J. Westacott	Barnstaple	United Kingdom	For private owner.
28 August	Cheviot	Steamship	Messrs. Earle	Hull	United Kingdom	For private owners.
28 August	Courrier du Maroc	Steamship	Scott & Co.	Greenock	United Kingdom	For Bazin, Leon, Gay & Co.
30 August	St. Elmo	Steamship	Messrs. Wingate	Whiteinch	United Kingdom	For private owner.
August	Agricola	Brigantine		Saint John	(United Kingdom of Great Britain and Ireland) Colony of New Brunswick	For private owner.
August	Ellen Morrison	Barque	J. Barkes	Sunderland	United Kingdom	For Mr Morrison.
August	Forth	Full-rigged ship		Quebec	(United Kingdom of Great Britain and Ireland) Province of Canada	For private owner.
August	Gleaner	Merchantman		Bristol	United Kingdom	For private owner.
1 September	Chili	Steamship	Langley	Rotherhithe	United Kingdom	For Messrs. Seymour, Peacock and Co.
1 September	Sangeen	Barque		Saint Charles River	(United Kingdom of Great Britain and Ireland) Province of Canada	Ran aground on being launched.
5 September	Blidah	Steamship	Messrs. Caird & Co.	Greenock	United Kingdom	For MM. Marc Fressinet Père et Fils.
5 September	Panther	Paddle steamer	Messrs. Robert Steele & Co.	Greenock	United Kingdom	For Messrs. G. & J. Burns & Co.
6 September	George W. Blunt	Schooner	Daniel Westervelt	New York	United States	For Joseph Henderson & James Callahan.
6 September	Wassenaar	Frigate	Rijkswerf	Amsterdam	Netherlands	For Royal Netherlands Navy.
11 September	Ann and Charlotte	Sloop	Messrs. E. & R. Teale	Harewood	United Kingdom	For John Kirk and Mr. Eastwood.
13 September	Flying Mist	Medium clipper	James O. Curtis	Medford, Massachusetts	United States	For Theodore Chase & George B. Chase.
15 September	Impérial	Algésiras-class ship of the line	Arsenal de Brest	Brest	France	For French Navy.
15 September	Ocean Monarch	Full-rigged ship	William H. Webb	New York	United States	For W. T. Frost.
16 September	Dennis Brundrit	Full-rigged ship	Messrs. Brundrit & Whiteway	Runcorn	United Kingdom	For Brundrit & Whiteway.
16 September	Elizabeth Jackson	Paddle steamer	Canada Works	Birkenhead	United Kingdom	For private owner.
16 September	Lumley	Snow	Edward Potts	Seaham	United Kingdom	For Mr. Lumley.
16 September	Stag	Barque	Messrs. Anderson	Granton	United Kingdom	For private owner.
17 September	Ahti	Tug		Hull	United Kingdom	For private owner.
17 September	Eastern Monarch	Merchantman	Messrs. Stephen & Sons	Dundee	United Kingdom	For Messrs. Somes Bros.
27 September	Admiral	Schooner	Webster	Fraserburgh	United Kingdom	For John Webster Jr.
28 September	François I	Steamship		Nantes	France	For private owner.
30 September	Fawn	Cruizer-class sloop		Deptford Dockyard	United Kingdom	For Royal Navy.
30 September	Plynlymmon	Steamship		Liverpool	United Kingdom	For private owner.
September	Alipede	Brig			Portugal	For private owner.
September	Auguste	Barque			France	For private owner.
September	Empress	Brigantine		Pwllheli	United Kingdom	For private owner.
September	Magna Bona	Merchantman	Follett	Exmouth	United Kingdom	For Messrs. Thomas & Richard Redway.
September	Pomona	Clipper	George & Thomas Boole	East Boston, Massachusetts	United States	For Howland & Frothington.
1 October	Confidence	Schooner	Messrs. Hugh Bannister & Co.	Lytham	United Kingdom	For private owner.
14 October	Diadem	Diadem-class frigate		Pembroke Dockyard	United Kingdom	For Royal Navy.
14 October	Eclipse	Barque	Mr. Vivian	Salcombe	United Kingdom	For private owner.
14 October	Lebanon	Snow	Denton & Hewson	Sunderland	United Kingdom	For Eggleston & Co.
15 October	Lalla Rookh	Tea clipper	Josiah Jones Jr.	Liverpool	United Kingdom	For William Prowse & Co.
15 October	Mexicana	Brig	Messrs. Gourlay Bros.	Dundee	United Kingdom	For private owners.
16 October	Mantura	Barque	Bowman and Drummond	Blyth	United Kingdom	For Reid, Hodgson & Crawford.
26 October	Charger	Medium clipper	E. G. Pearce	Portsmouth, New Hampshire	United States	For Henry Hastings.
28 October	Tilsit	Steamship	Messrs. Wiliam Simons & Co.	Whiteinch	United Kingdom	For private owner.
29 October	Londesborough	Brig	William Doxford	Coxgreen	United Kingdom	For Messrs. Liversidge & Banks.
29 October	Robin Hood	Tea clipper	Messrs. Alexander Hall & Sons	Aberdeen	United Kingdom	For James Beazley.
30 October	Barnsley	Steamship	Messrs. Martin Samuelson & Co.	Hull	United Kingdom	For Anglo-French Company.
October	Shields	Brig	Bowman and Drummond	Blyth	United Kingdom	For William Blenkinsop and Enoch Halder.
1 November	Tiger	Steamship	Messrs. Brownlow & Co.	Hull	United Kingdom	For private owner.
2 November	Petropolis	Steamship	Messrs. Caird & Co.	Glasgow	United Kingdom	For Hamburg and Brazil Navigation Company.
13 November	William Fairbairne	Full-rigged ship	John Laird	Liverpool	United Kingdom	For Potter, Brothers & Co.
15 November	Kirkham	Full-rigged ship	John Laird	Birkenhead	United Kingdom	For W. T. Jacob.
21 November	Verbano	Steamship		Trieste	Austria	For Österreichischer Lloyd.
29 November	Stockholm	Ship of the line	Karlskrona Naval Shipyard	Karlskrona	Sweden	For Royal Swedish Navy.
November	Osnabrück	Full-rigged ship		Glasgow	United Kingdom	For private owner.
November	Santa Teresa	Steamship		Ferrol	Spain	For private owner.
2 December	Foudre	Frigate		Toulon	France	For French Navy.
10 December	Little Dorrit	Merchantman	Messrs. Richardson & Duck	Stockton-on-Tees	United Kingdom	For private owner.
13 December	Dove	Merchantman	Thomas B. Seath	Rutherglen	United Kingdom	For James Steel & Sons.
14 December	Fethiyé	Ship of the line		Constantinople	Ottoman Empire	For Ottoman Navy.
14 December	Prerogative	Barque		Dover	(United Kingdom of Great Britain and Ireland) Colony of New Brunswick	For private owner.
20 December	Etna	Paddle steamer	Messrs. J. & G. Thomson	Govan	United Kingdom	For Messrs. Fiorio.
29 December	Black Hawk	Medium clipper	William H. Webb	New York City	United States	For Bucklin & Crane, New York. Generally listed as launched in 1857.
30 December	Scout	Pearl-class corvette		Woolwich Dockyard	United Kingdom	For Royal Navy.
December	Abeona	Steamship	Messrs. Malcomson	Waterford	United Kingdom	For private owner.
December	Charlemagne	Full-rigged ship	Messrs. Alexander Stephen & Sons	Kelvinside	United Kingdom	For private owner.
Spring	Lyonnais	Steamship	John Laird	Liverpool	United Kingdom	For Messrs. Gauthier, Frères et Cie.
Spring	Snowdrop	Full-rigged ship	Messrs. Robert McCord & Son	Quebec	(United Kingdom of Great Britain and Ireland) Province of Canada	For private owner.
Spring	Vortigern	Full-rigged ship		Quebec	(United Kingdom of Great Britain and Ireland) Province of Canada	For private owner.
Autumn	Loiret	Transport ship		Cherbourg	France	For French Navy.
Autumn	Somme	Transport ship		Cherbourg	France	For French Navy.
Unknown date	Adria	Frigate			Austrian Empire	For Austrian Navy.
Unknown date	Alacrity	Barque	W. Johnson	Sunderland	United Kingdom	For T. Todd.
Unknown date	Alice	Barque	James Hardie	Sunderland	United Kingdom	For J. Ritson.
Unknown date	Ampthill	Merchantman	Peter Austin	Sunderland	United Kingdom	For Wilson Bros.
Unknown date	Anne Lee	Barque	P. Gibson	Sunderland	United Kingdom	For private owner.
Unknown date	Anniversary	Snow	Pickersgill & Miller	Sunderland	United Kingdom	For John Snowdon.
Unknown date	Ardville	Barque	William Naizby	Sunderland	United Kingdom	For J. Lemon.
Unknown date	Areta	Full-rigged ship	W. Chilton	Sunderland	United Kingdom	For J. Clay.
Unknown date	Arey	Clipper	Williams & Arey	Frankfort, Maine	United States	For Willias & ARey.
Unknown date	Ark	Snow	Jopling & Willoughby	Sunderland	United Kingdom	For Mr. Jopling.
Unknown date	Asa Eldridge	Clipper	E. & H. O. Briggs	South Boston, Massachusetts	United States	For Henry Hallett.
Unknown date	Ashley Down	Brig	Pickersgill & Miller	Sunderland	United Kingdom	For Pickersgill & Co.
Unknown date	Aspasia	Clipper	Maxon, Fish & Co.	Mystic, Connecticut	United States	For N. G. Fish & Co.
Unknown date	Assaye	steam frigate		Bombay	India	For British East India Company.
Unknown date	Atmosphere	Clipper	George Greenman	Mystic, Connecticut	United States	For John A. McGaw.
Unknown date	Aurora Australis	Merchantman	James Laing	Sunderland	United Kingdom	For Mr. McPherson.
Unknown date	Bacchante	Full-rigged ship	James Laing	Sunderland	United Kingdom	For Mr. Beazeley.
Unknown date	Banryū	Paddle steamer	R. & H. Green	Blackwall	United Kingdom	For Tokugawa Navy.
Unknown date	Birch Grove	Barque	Austin & Mills	Sunderland	United Kingdom	For S. & J. Pegg.
Unknown date	Bloomer	Sternwheeler		New Albany, Indiana	United States	For private owner.
Unknown date	Bohio	Brig		Williamsburg, New York	United States	For private owner.
Unknown date	Braziliera	Barque	J. J. Abrahams	Baltimore, Maryland	United States	For private owner.
Unknown date	Broughton Hall	Barque		Saint John	(United Kingdom of Great Britain and Ireland) Colony of New Brunswick	For private owner.
Unknown date	Cactus	Snow	George Barker	Sunderland	United Kingdom	For William Tose.
Unknown date	Cæsar	Steamship		Pola	Austrian Empire	For Austrian Navy.
Unknown date	Canterbury	Merchantman	George Bartram & Sons	Sunderland	United Kingdom	For H. Cross.
Unknown date	Carausius	Barque	William Harkess	Sunderland	United Kingdom	For E. Oliver.
Unknown date	Castor	Sloop		Sunderland	United Kingdom	For private owner.
Unknown date	Celandine	Snow	Jobling & Hodgson	Sunderland	United Kingdom	For Evans & Co.
Unknown date	Ceres	Paddle steamer		Keyport, New Jersey	United States	For private owner.
Unknown date	Charlotte	Merchantman		Sunderland	United Kingdom	For private owner.
Unknown date	Chili	Barque	G. Worthy	Sunderland	United Kingdom	For Moon & Co.
Unknown date	Choctaw	Paddle steamer		New Albany, Indiana	United States	For private owner.
Unknown date	Creole	Clipper			United Kingdom	For private owner.
Unknown date	Chryseis	Barque	Austin & Mills	Sunderland	United Kingdom	For Clay & Co.
Unknown date	Cincinattus	Full-rigged ship	J. Haswell	Sunderland	United Kingdom	For J. Hay.
Unknown date	City of Lyons	Steamship	Messrs. John Reid & Co.	Port Glasgow	United Kingdom	For private owner.
Unknown date	City of Nantes	Merchantman	James Laing	Sunderland	United Kingdom	For E. T. Gourley et al.
Unknown date	Clarendon	Full-rigged ship		Sunderland	United Kingdom	For Lonie & Co.
Unknown date	Cleadon	Full-rigged ship	W. H. Pearson	Sunderland	United Kingdom	For J. Y. Gourley & Son.
Unknown date	Coquetdale	Barque	Green, Robinson & Co., or Green & Co.	Sunderland	United Kingdom	For Mr. Dobinson.
Unknown date	Cospatrick	Full-rigged ship		Moulmein	Burma	For Duncan Dunbar.
Unknown date	Cumberland	Full-rigged ship	Robert Thompson & Sons	Sunderland	United Kingdom	For E. Graham.
Unknown date	Curlew	Paddle steamer	Harlan & Hollingsworth	Wilmington, Delaware	United States	For Thomas D. Warren.
Unknown date	Curlew	Steamboat	Samuel Sneden	Greenpoint, New York	United States	For Commercial Steamboat Company
Unknown date	Daniel Jefferies	Snow	John Robinson	Sunderland	United Kingdom	For D. Jefferies.
Unknown date	De Cater	Steamship	Messrs. Earle's	Hull	United Kingdom	For private owner.
Unknown date	Donau	Frigate			Austrian Empire	For Austrian Navy.
Unknown date	Dorothy	Snow	Hodgson & Gardner	Sunderland	United Kingdom	For J. Walker.
Unknown date	Eastfield	Barque	G. W. & W. J. Hall	Sunderland	United Kingdom	For Currie & Co.
Unknown date	East Indian	Clipper	Currier & Townsend	Newburyport, Massachusetts	United States	For Stephen Tilton & Co.
Unknown date	Elizabeth	Brig	M. Byers & Co	Sunderland	United Kingdom	For Mr. Legender.
Unknown date	Elizabeth Ann	Full-rigged ship	G. Shevill	Sunderland	United Kingdom	For William Sanderson.
Unknown date	Eliza Sharp	Merchantman	Robert Thompson & Sons	Sunderland	United Kingdom	For Nicholson & Co.
Unknown date	Empress	Clipper	Paul Curtis	East Boston, Massachusetts	United States	For H. Harbeck & Co.
Unknown date	Endeavor	Clipper	Robert E. Jackson	East Boston, Massachusetts	United States	For Cunningham Brothers.
Unknown date	England	Steamship	Messrs. Laurence, Hill, & Co.	Port Glasgow	United Kingdom	For private owner.
Unknown date	Enterprize	Steamship	James Laing	Sunderland	United Kingdom	For Laing & Co.
Unknown date	Erne	Albacore-class gunboat	Messrs. T. & W. Smith	North Shields	United Kingdom	For Royal Navy.
Unknown date	Erromanga	Barque	Lawson Gales	Sunderland	United Kingdom	For Fenwick & Co.
Unknown date	Essays	Snow	V. & J. Pratt	Sunderland	United Kingdom	For Cook & Co.
Unknown date	Everglade	Steamship		New York	United States	For private owner.
Unknown date	Excelsior	Merchantman		Sunderland	United Kingdom	For private owner.
Unknown date	Excelsior	Barque	George Barker	Sunderland	United Kingdom	For T. White.
Unknown date	Excelsior	Barque	R. Y. Watson	Sunderland	United Kingdom	For Rodham & Co.
Unknown date	Faerie Queen	Barque	William Pile Jr.	Sunderland	United Kingdom	For J. Kelso.
Unknown date	Flora	Barque	L. & T. C. Gales	Sunderland	United Kingdom	For Watson & Co.
Unknown date	Florida	Coaster		Mobile, Alabama	United States	For Mobile Mail Line.
Unknown date	Frederick Retzlaff	Barque		Stettin	Prussia	For private owner.
Unknown date	F. T. Barney	Schooner	William Cheney	Vermillion, Ohio	United States	For Lewis Wells.
Unknown date	General Windham	Full-rigged ship	T. Seymour	Sunderland	United Kingdom	For B. Moir.
Unknown date	George	Snow	Jobung & Co	Sunderland	United Kingdom	For Charles Cairns.
Unknown date	George Potts	Snow	J. Lister	Sunderland	United Kingdom	For R. Wright.
Unknown date	Gosforth	East Indiaman	T. & W. Smith	North Shields	United Kingdom	For private owner.
Unknown date	Grace & Jane	Barque	P. Gibson	Sunderland	United Kingdom	For Elwin & Co.
Unknown date	Grampus	Sternwheeler		McKeesport, Pennsylvania	United States	For private owner.
Unknown date	Hadassah	Full-rigged ship	M. Byers & Co.	Sunderland	United Kingdom	For Mr. Leadbitter.
Unknown date	Handy	Clown-class gunboat	Messrs. Pitcher's	Northfleet	United Kingdom	For Royal Navy.
Unknown date	Hannah Park	Full-rigged ship	C. W. Crown	Sunderland	United Kingdom	For Duncan McBrayne Park.
Unknown date	Hartlepool	Snow	James Hardie	Sunderland	United Kingdom	For Mr. Porteous.
Unknown date	Hearty	Gunboat	Messrs. Pitcher's	Northfleet	United Kingdom	For Royal Navy.
Unknown date	Heather Bell	Barque	J. Davison	Sunderland	United Kingdom	For R. Hick.
Unknown date	Helena	Barque	W. Naizby	Sunderland	United Kingdom	For H. Smith.
Unknown date	Helvellyn	Full-rigged ship	Robert Thomson & Sons	Sunderland	United Kingdom	For E. Graham.
Unknown date	Hermione	Barque	A. Leithead	Sunderland	United Kingdom	For Mr. Richardson.
Unknown date	Hesperus	Clipper	J. T. Foster	Medford, Connecticut	United States	For Thomas B. Wales & Co.
Unknown date	Hong Kong	Paddle steamer			Unknown	For private owner.
Unknown date	Hope-on	Brig	J. Barkes	Sunderland	United Kingdom	For J. Hunter.
Unknown date	Hunter	Barque	Taylor & Scouler	Sunderland	United Kingdom	For Mr. Nicholson.
Unknown date	Intrepid	Medium clipper	William H. Webb	New York	United States	For Bucklin & Crane.
Unknown date	James Lemon	Barque	George Booth	Sunderland	United Kingdom	For J. Lemon.
Unknown date	Jane Almond	Barque	Thomas Stonehouse	Sunderland	United Kingdom	For J. Almond.
Unknown date	John Purdie	Schooner	George Booth	Sunderland	United Kingdom	For W. Crowell.
Unknown date	John Robinson	Barque	Hodgson & Gardner	Sunderland	United Kingdom	For J. Robinson.
Unknown date	Jolly's	Merchantman	R. Sanderson	Sunderland	United Kingdom	For R. Jolly.
Unknown date	Joseph Peabody	Medium clipper	E. & H. O. Briggs	South Boston, Massachusetts	United States	For Curtis & Peabody.
Unknown date	Julia Augusta	Barque	R. Y. Watson	Sunderland	United Kingdom	For W. Hopper.
Unknown date	Jupiter	Steamship	Messrs. Young, Son & Magnay	Limehouse	United Kingdom	For Österreichischer Lloyd.
Unknown date	Kennington	Full-rigged ship	Edward Bailey	Sunderland	United Kingdom	For Douglas & Co.
Unknown date	Kindrochat	Barque	G. Gardner & Co.	Sunderland	United Kingdom	For G. Miller.
Unknown date	King Philip	Medium clipper	D. Weymouth	Alna, Maine	United States	For Glidden & William.
Unknown date	Lammermuir	Extreme clipper	William Pile	Sunderland	United Kingdom	For John Willis & Son.
Unknown date	Lansdowne	Barque	William Richard Abbay	Sunderland	United Kingdom	For Mr. Vickermann.
Unknown date	Laurent Millaudon	Steamboat		Cincinnati, Ohio	United States	For private owner.
Unknown date	Legatus	Barque	J. Rodgerson	Sunderland	United Kingdom	For Lonie & Co.
Unknown date	Livingstone	Snow	William Chilton	Sunderland	United Kingdom	For Mr. Redhead.
Unknown date	Lord of the Isles	Clipper	Scotts Shipbuilding and Engineering Co. Ltd.	Greenock	United Kingdom	For private owner.
Unknown date	Lowick	Barque	R. Thompson Jr.	Sunderland	United Kingdom	For W. Allen.
Unknown date	Lusitania	Paddle steamer	Messrs. John Reid & Co.	Port Glasbow	United Kingdom	For private owner.
Unknown date	Mahratta	Full-rigged ship	George Booth	Sunderland	United Kingdom	For Mr. McDonald.
Unknown date	Margaret Knight	Merchantman	Pickersgill & Miller	Sunderland	United Kingdom	For T. Knight.
Unknown date	Marina	Barque	G. Gardner & Co.	Sunderland	United Kingdom	For John Wheatley.
Unknown date	Mars	Full-rigged ship	J. & R. Mills	Southwick	United Kingdom	For J. Allen.
Unknown date	Martha Clay	Barque	N. Stothard	Sunderland	United Kingdom	For H. Nelson.
Unknown date	Mary Bangs	Clipper	Paul Curtis	East Boston, Massachusetts	United States	For W. H. Bangs & Co.
Unknown date	Mary Jane	Barque	Forest & Co.	Sunderland	United Kingdom	For Mr. Denniston.
Unknown date	Mary & Kate	Snow	James Hardie	Sunderland	United Kingdom	For Campbell & Co.
Unknown date	Mary L. Sutton	Medium clipper	Charles H. Mallory	Mystic, Connecticut	United States	For Charles H. Mallory.
Unknown date	Mastiff	Clipper	Donald McKay	East Boston, Massachusetts	United States	For Warren Delano.
Unknown date	Morning Light	Sailing ship	William and Richard Wright	Wilmot	(United Kingdom of Great Britain and Ireland) Colony of Nova Scotia	For William and Richard Wright.
Unknown date	M. W. Chapin	Tug		Philadelphia, Pennsylvania	United States	private owner.
Unknown date	Mystery	Steamship	Messrs. Ryde & Co.	Bristol	United Kingdom	For private owner.
Unknown date	New Era	Ferry		New Albany, Indiana	United States	For private owner
Unknown date	Newton	Barque	John Watson	Sunderland	United Kingdom	For Newton & Co.
Unknown date	Nina	Steamship	Messrs. Laurence, Hill, & Co.	Port Glasgow	United Kingdom	For private owner.
Unknown date	Norfolk	Barque	T. Lightfoot	North Hylton	United Kingdom	For Scott & Co.
Unknown date	Norseman	Clipper	Robert E. Jackson	East Boston, Massachusetts	United States	For Cunningham Bros. & Co.
Unknown date	Ocean	Snow	William R. Abbay	Sunderland	United Kingdom	For Catt & Co.
Unknown date	Olive Branch	Barque	M. Clarke	Sunderland	United Kingdom	For T. Hick.
Unknown date	Osprey	Barque	Pile & Smart	Sunderland	United Kingdom	For Ingo & Co.
Unknown date	Pacific	Barque	Richard Wilkinson	Sunderland	United Kingdom	For J. Longton.
Unknown date	Pamlico	Paddle steamer		New York	United States	For private owner.
Unknown date	Paul	Barque	J. Lister	Sunderland	United Kingdom	For W. Clough.
Unknown date	Pax	Brig	R. Sanderson	Sunderland	United Kingdom	For Gideon Smales.
Unknown date	Peace	Barque	Ratcliff & Spence	Sunderland	United Kingdom	For Mears & Sons.
Unknown date	Potosi	Merchantman	Messrs. John Reid & Co.	Port Glasgow	United Kingdom	For private owner.
Unknown date	Princess Royal	Snow	T. Seymour	Sunderland	United Kingdom	For Jobling & Co.
Unknown date	Queen of Freedom	Barque	Todd & Brown	Sunderland	United Kingdom	For M. Aisbett.
Unknown date	Raby Castle	Full-rigged ship	George Short	Sunderland	United Kingdom	For Mr. Greenwell.
Unknown date	Reays	Barque	Ratcliff & Spencer	Sunderland	United Kingdom	For Mr. Reay.
Unknown date	Regina	Full-rigged ship		River Wear	United Kingdom	For private owner.
Unknown date	Reynard	Medium clipper	George W. Jackman	Newburyport, Massachusetts	United States	For Bush & Comstock.
Unknown date	Robin Hood	Clipper	Alexander Hall and Sons	Aberdeen	United Kingdom	J. Wade.
Unknown date	Rocket	Brig	W. R. Abbay & Co.	Sunderland	United Kingdom	For W. & T. Adamson.
Unknown date	Roebuck	Barque	Thomas Collyer	New York	United States	For private owner.
Unknown date	Royal Saxon	Barque	William Taylor	Sunderland	United Kingdom	For Mr. Rickinson.
Unknown date	Russell Ellice	Barque	C. W. Crown	Sunderland	United Kingdom	For Mr. Nicholson.
Unknown date	San Fernando	Merchantman	J. Watson	Sunderland	United Kingdom	For Mr. Nicholson.
Unknown date	Santiago	Barque	Henry Balfour	Methil	United Kingdom	For Balfour Williamson.
Unknown date	Sarah Jane	Snow	J. & R. Mills	Sunderland	United Kingdom	For Mr. Humble.
Unknown date	Sarah Scott	Barque	N. Stothard	Sunderland	United Kingdom	For Scott & Co.
Unknown date	Sarepta	Barque	Haswell	Sunderland	United Kingdom	For Haswell & Co.
Unknown date	Seaflower	Barque		Wallace	(United Kingdom of Great Britain and Ireland) Colony of Nova Scotia	For private owner.
Unknown date	Sea Venture	Merchantman	Robert Thompson & Sons	Sunderland	United Kingdom	For J. Robinson.
Unknown date	Sedgemoor	Full-rigged ship	Woods, Spence & Co	Sunderland	United Kingdom	For Woods & Co.
Unknown date	Silloth	Steamship	Messrs. Laurence, Hill & Co.	Port Glasgow	United Kingdom	For private owner.
Unknon date	Silver Star	Clipper	J. O. Curtis	Medford, Massachusetts	United States	For Reed & Wade.
Unknown date	Sirocco	Barque	Forrest & Co.	Sunderland	United Kingdom	For James Hay.
Unknown date	Skibladner	Paddle steamer	Motala Verkstad	Motala	Sweden	For private owner
Unknown date	Spartan	Full-rigged ship	William Pile Jr.	Sunderland	United Kingdom	For J. R. Kelso.
Unknown date	Sultan	Barque	Syles & Co	Sunderland	United Kingdom	For R. Barnett.
Unknown date	Sunderland Packet	Brigantine	Green, Robinson & Co	Sunderland	United Kingdom	For French & Co.
Unknown date	Sylph	Merchantman	James Laing	Sunderland	United Kingdom	For J. & C. Robertson.
Unknown date	Tamahao	Barque	W. H. Baldwin	Quebec	(United Kingdom of Great Britain and Ireland) Province of Canada	For private owner.
Unknown date	Thames	Full-rigged ship	D. A. Douglass	Southwick	United Kingdom	For Bonus & Sons.
Unknown date	Thames City	Full-rigged ship	D. A. Douglass	Southwick	United Kingdom	For H. Rounthwaite.
Unknown date	The Bride	Barque	W. H. Pearson	Sunderland	United Kingdom	For Mr. Douglas.
Unknown date	Thoughtful	snow	George Bartram & Sons	Sunderland	United Kingdom	For Riches & Co.
Unknown date	Trio	Schooner	William Harkness	Sunderland	United Kingdom	For Flett & Co.
Unknown date	Two Sisters	Schooner		Baltimore, Maryland	United States	For private owner.
Unknown date	Una	Snow	Rawson & Watson	Sunderland	United Kingdom	For G. Smales.
Unknown date	Uncowah	Clipper	William H. Webb	New York	United States	For private owner.
Unknown date	Urania	Brig	J. Hardie	Sunderland	United Kingdom	For W. Bird.
Unknown date	Valparaiso	Paddle steamer	Messrs. John Reid & Co.	Port Glasgow	United Kingdom	For private owner.
Unknown date	Verbena	Barque	T. Alcock	Sunderland	United Kingdom	For Henry Alcock.
Unknown date	Virgilia	Barque	H. Carr	Sunderland	United Kingdom	For M. Twedell.
Unknown date	Vittorio Emmannuele	Frigate		Genpa	Kingdom of Sardinia	For Royal Sardinian Navy.
Unknown date	Warrior Queen	Full-rigged ship	James Briggs & Co.	Sunderland	United Kingdom	For Bradley & Co.
Unknown date	Washington	Barque	Todd & Brown	Sunderland	United Kingdom	For M. Tweddell, E. Tweddell, J. Todd & C. Brown.
Unknown date	Waterlily	Barque	W. R. Abbay & Co.	Sunderland	United Kingdom	For Farrow & Co.
Unknown date	Waterlily	Barque	Edward Bailey	Sunderland	United Kingdom	For Laing & Co.
Unknown date	Waterloo	Merchantman	Rawson & Watson	Sunderland	United Kingdom	For W. Davison.
Unknown date	Webfoot	Medium clipper	Shiverick Brothers	East Dennis, Massachusetts	United States	For Prince S. Cowell.
Unknown date	Western World	Steamship		Brooklyn, New York	United States	For private owner.
Unknown date	Wild Dayrell	Merchantman	J. & R. Bailey	Shoreham-by-Sea	United Kingdom	For private owner.
Unknown date	William H. Webb	Paddle steamer	William Henry Webb	New York	United States	For private owner.
Unknown date	Wolfe	Gunboat	Messrs. Wigram	Blackwall	United Kingdom	For Royal Navy.
Unknown date	Yedo	Corvette	C. Gips & Zonen	Dordrecht	Netherlands	For Tokugawa Navy.
Unknown date	Zoophite	Snow	Pile & Smart	Sunderland	United Kingdom	For private owner.
