= Dickson River (New Zealand) =

Coordinates: 43°01′08″S 170°52′25″E

Location
- Country: New Zealand

Physical characteristics
- Source
  - location: Southern Alps
  - elevation: 1,180 m (3,870 ft)
- Mouth
  - elevation: 125 m (410 ft)
- Length: 8 km (5.0 mi)

The Dickson River is a river of the West Coast Region of New Zealand. It arises near the Dickson Pass in the Southern Alps and flows north-west. It joins the Tuke River and flows into the Mikonui River, which exits in the Tasman Sea near Ross.

== See also ==
- List of rivers of New Zealand
