= HMS Cordelia (1856) =

Ship launched in 1870

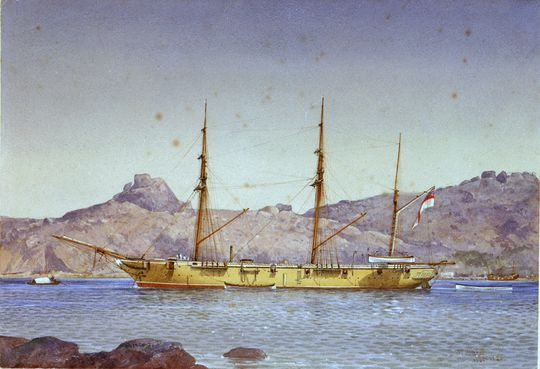
- HMS Icarus, sister-ship to Cordelia

History

United Kingdom
- Name: HMS Cordelia
- Ordered: 3 April 1854
- Builder: Pembroke Dockyard
- Laid down: October 1855
- Launched: 3 July 1856
- Completed: at Plymouth
- Commissioned: 11 April 1857
- Decommissioned: 1870
- Fate: Sold on 12 May 1870 for breaking

General characteristics
- Class & type: Racer-class sloop
- Displacement: 861 tons
- Tons burthen: 577 30/94 bm
- Length: 151 ft (46.0 m) (gundeck); 131 ft 3.75 in (40.0 m) (keel)
- Beam: 29 ft 1 in (8.9 m)
- Depth of hold: 15 ft 10 in (4.8 m)
- Installed power: 461 ihp (344 kW)
- Propulsion: 2-cylinder horizontal single-expansion steam engine; Single screw
- Sail plan: Barque rig
- Speed: 9.9 knots (18.3 km/h; 11.4 mph)
- Complement: 120
- Armament: 1 × 32 pdr gun (58 cwt) on pivot; 10 × 32 pdr (25 cwt) carronades

HMS Cordelia was an 11-gun Racer-class sloop of the Royal Navy launched in 1856 and sold in 1870.

== Design ==
Built of a traditional wooden construction, the Racer class were a lengthened version of the Swallow-class sloop, (Note: Cordelia and Gannet were ordered as Swallow-class ships but the design was changed before construction.) which in turn had been intended as "type of screw vessel below the Cruizer". The extra length gave greater speed, and combined with a considerable increase in power, this gave a speed of about 10 knots (19 km/h; 12 mph), rather more than the 7 knots (13 km/h; 8.1 mph) of the previous class.

The class were armed with a single 32-pounder (58 cwt) gun on a pivot mount and ten 32-pounder (25 cwt) carronades on the broadside. These guns were all smoothbore muzzle-loading, and were little changed from the standard guns of Nelson's era.

Propulsion was provided by a James Watt & Co two-cylinder horizontal single-expansion steam engine developing 461 indicated horsepower (344 kW) and driving a single screw. At maximum power under steam, her top speed was about 9.9 knots (18.3 km/h; 11.4 mph). A barque rig of sails was carried, which meant she had three masts with a square rig on the fore and main masts.

== Construction ==
Cordelia was laid down at Pembroke Dockyard in October 1855 and launched on 3 July 1856. The total cost was £33,428, of which the machinery cost £9,014.

== Royal Navy service ==
She was commissioned on 11 April 1857 under Commander Charles Egerton Harcourt-Vernon and initially sent to the East Indies Station until being assigned to the Australia Station in 1859. In 1860 she served in the First Taranaki War. Command passed in June 1861 to Commander Francis Alexander Hume; on returning to the UK, she was paid off at Plymouth on 2 April 1862.

She was recommissioned on 24 June 1864 under Commander John Binney Scott and then served in the North American and West Indies Station until she was paid off on 9 July 1868 at Plymouth; meanwhile Commander Thomas Alexis De Wahl had been given command on 3 March 1865 when Scott became invalided, and was in turn succeeded on 16 September 1867 by Commander Charles Parry.

== Fate ==
She was sold on 12 May 1870 for breaking up at Plymouth.
