= HMS Kestrel (1856) =

History

United Kingdom
- Name: HMS Kestrel
- Ordered: January 1856
- Builder: William Cowley Miller, Toxteth Dock, Liverpool
- Cost: £10,273
- Laid down: 14 January 1856
- Launched: 26 May 1856
- Fate: Sold to Glover & Co., Yokohama, 16 March 1866

General characteristics
- Class & type: Clown-class gunboat
- Tons burthen: 232 80/94 tons bm
- Length: 110 ft (34 m) (gundeck); 95 ft 5.25 in (29.0894 m) (keel)
- Beam: 21 ft 10 in (6.65 m)
- Draught: 4 ft 0 in (1.22 m)
- Depth of hold: 6 ft 7 in (2.01 m)
- Installed power: 40 nominal horsepower; (Woodcock 145 ihp (108 kW))
- Propulsion: 1-cylinder horizontal direct-acting single-expansion steam engine; Single screw
- Speed: 7.5 kn (13.9 km/h)
- Complement: 30
- Armament: 1 × 68-pounder, 1 × 32-pounder SBML guns

HMS Kestrel was a Clown-class gunboat of the Royal Navy. She was launched in 1856, serving in China and Japan in the 1850s and 1860s. She saw action during the Second Opium War and the Taiping Rebellion.

== Design ==
The Clown class was an improved version of the preceding Cheerful class designed by W.H. Walker. The ships were wooden-hulled, with steam power as well as sails, and of particularly shallow draught (design draught 4 ft (1.2 m)) for coastal bombardment in shallow waters. Ships of the class were provided with a typical "gunboat rig" of three gaff rigged masts with a total sail area of 4,889 sq ft (454.2 m^{2}). One-cylinder horizontal direct-acting single-expansion steam engine built by John Penn and Sons, with two boilers, provided 40 nominal horsepower through a single screw, sufficient for 7.5 knots (13.9 km/h; 8.6 mph). Ships of the class were armed with one 68-pounder and one 32-pounder smooth bore muzzle loading cannons.

== Service ==
On 25 June 1859, Kestrel participated in the second Battle of Taku Forts. She suffered heavy damage in the subsequent British defeat, where she "sunk halfway to its funnels" in the Hai River. Despite her damage, Kestrel was recovered.

By 1860, Kestrel was under the command of Lieutenant Henry Huxham and was aiding the Qing government against Taiping troops. Kestrel was later stationed in Imperialist-controlled Ningbo. On 6 November 1861, Huxham and his officers rode around the walls of Ningbo to deter the Taiping advance. Towards the end of November, Kestrel, carrying British and American Consuls of the city, travelled to Yuyao to parley with Taiping chiefs in the hopes of dissuading Taiping troops from attacking the city. Their requests were respected for a time until 9 December, when Taiping troops attacked and occupied Ningbo.

Kestrel eventually participated in the retaking of Ningbo on 10 May 1862, her men disembarking under fire at one point to swing open a pontoon bridge. It was reported that Kestrel was shot 68 times and her rigging was "severely cut about."

On 10 December 1862, command of Kestrel was transferred to Lieut. Hamilton Dunlop. Henry Felix Woods, who would later rise to prominence as an Admiral in the Ottoman Navy, joined the crew of Kestrel as the second master on 20 November 1863. From 1863, Kestrel was posted to Japan to guard Yokohama. In 1865, while being stationed in Yokohama, Woods became acquainted with photographer Felice Beato, who loaned from Woods photographic equipment and chemicals.

Kestrel was sold to Glover & Co. of Yokohama on 16 March 1866, before being eventually resold to Japanese owners, supposedly the Japanese Navy, though the ship was not found in the Japanese Navy records.
