= HMS Harrier (1854) =

Sloop of the Royal Navy

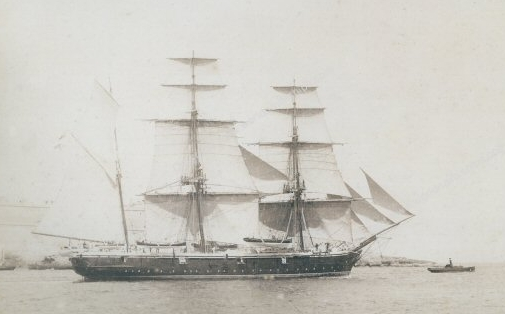
- Cruizer, sister-ship to Harrier

History

United Kingdom
- Name: HMS Harrier
- Ordered: 18 July 1851
- Builder: Pembroke Dockyard
- Laid down: November 1851
- Launched: 13 May 1854
- Commissioned: 3 November 1854
- Decommissioned: 1866
- Fate: Broken up at Portsmouth in 1866

General characteristics
- Class & type: Cruizer-class screw sloop
- Displacement: 1,045 tons
- Tons burthen: 747 51/94 bm
- Length: 160 ft (49 m) (gundeck); 140 ft 1.75 in (42.7165 m) (keel)
- Beam: 31 ft 10 in (9.70 m)
- Depth of hold: 17 ft 6 in (5.33 m)
- Installed power: 100 nominal horsepower; 360 ihp (270 kW)
- Propulsion: Two-cylinder horizontal single-expansion steam engine; Single screw
- Sail plan: Barque-rigged
- Speed: 8.3 kn (15.4 km/h)
- Armament: One 32-pdr (56cwt) pivot gun; Sixteen 32-pdr (32cwt) carriage guns

HMS Harrier was a Royal Navy Cruizer-class screw sloop launched in 1854. She took part in the Crimean War, served on the Australia Station and took part in the New Zealand Wars. She was broken up in 1865

== Construction ==
Harrier was launched on 13 May 1854 from Pembroke Dockyard.

== Service history ==
=== Crimean War ===
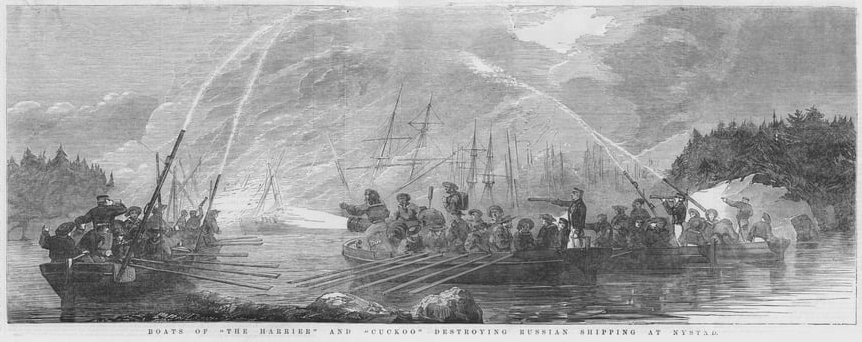
Boats of the Harrier and Cuckoo destroying Russian shipping at Nystad, in 1855. Illustrated London News from a sketch by John Wilson Carmichael

From 1854 to 1856 Harrier took part in the Crimean War as part of the naval force in the Baltic Sea. She served on the South Atlantic Station before refitting in Portsmouth in 1860.

=== Australia station ===
She recommissioned on 29 October 1860 for the Australia Station. She undertook a punitive action against Fijian natives in 1863.

=== New Zealand Wars ===
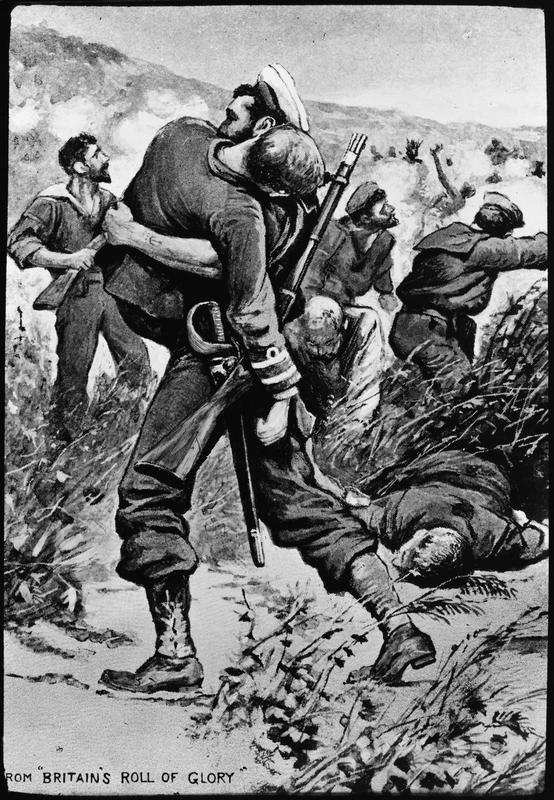
The action for which Samuel Mitchell was awarded the Victoria Cross

She took part in the rescue operations when HMS Orpheus was wrecked in Manukau Harbour, New Zealand and was also grounded but was refloated. She undertook operations during the Invasion of Waikato and the Tauranga Campaign in New Zealand. Her captain, Commander Edward Hay, was killed on 30 April 1864 during the storming of Gate Pā, and his coxswain, Samuel Mitchell, was awarded the Victoria Cross for his bravery.

== Fate ==
Harrier paid off at Portsmouth on 31 March 1865 and was broken up the next year.
