= Tuke River =

River in New Zealand

Coordinates: 43°01′S 170°52′E

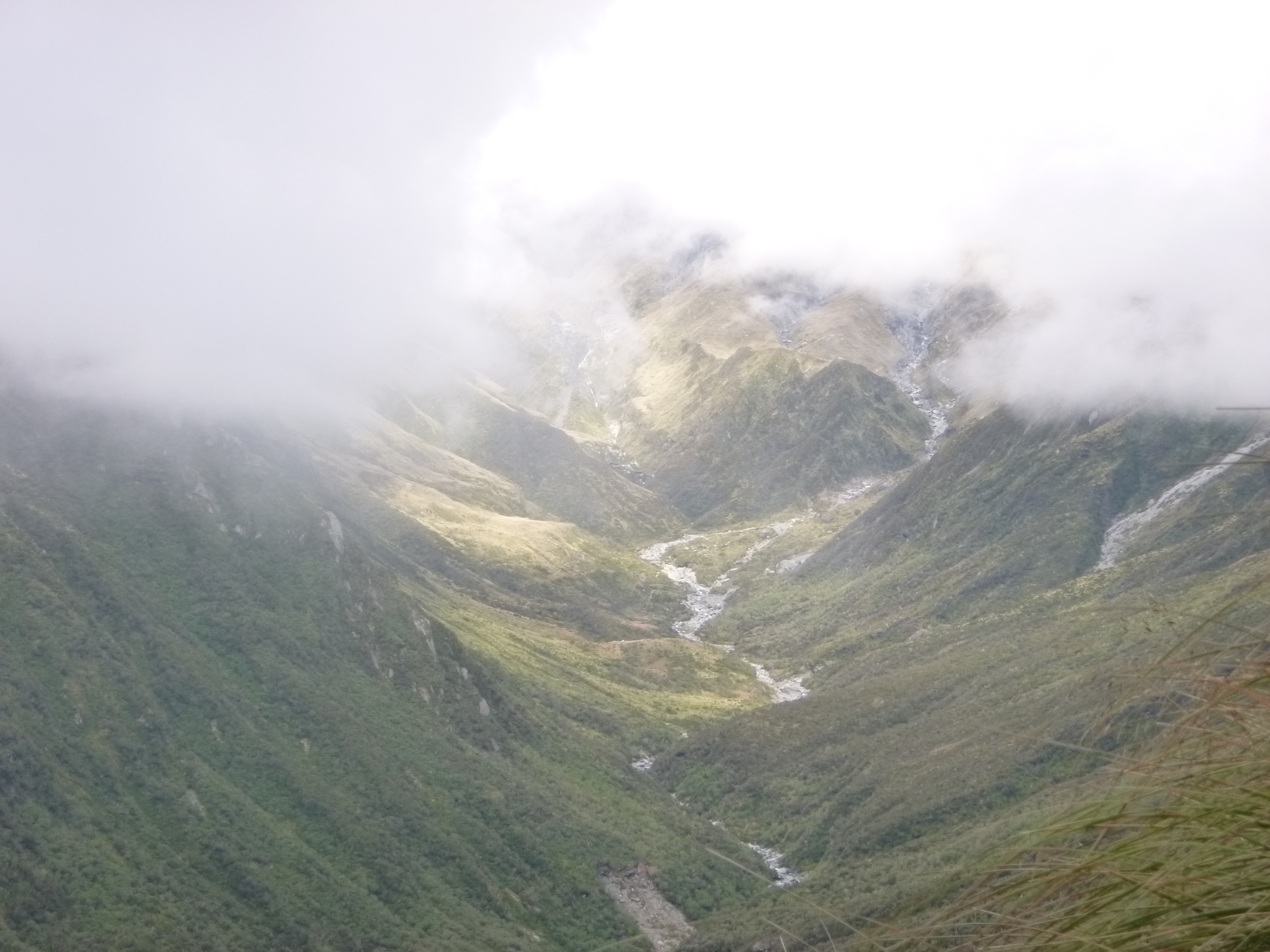

Location
- Country: New Zealand

Physical characteristics
- Mouth
  - location: Mikonui River
- Length: 12 km (7.5 mi)

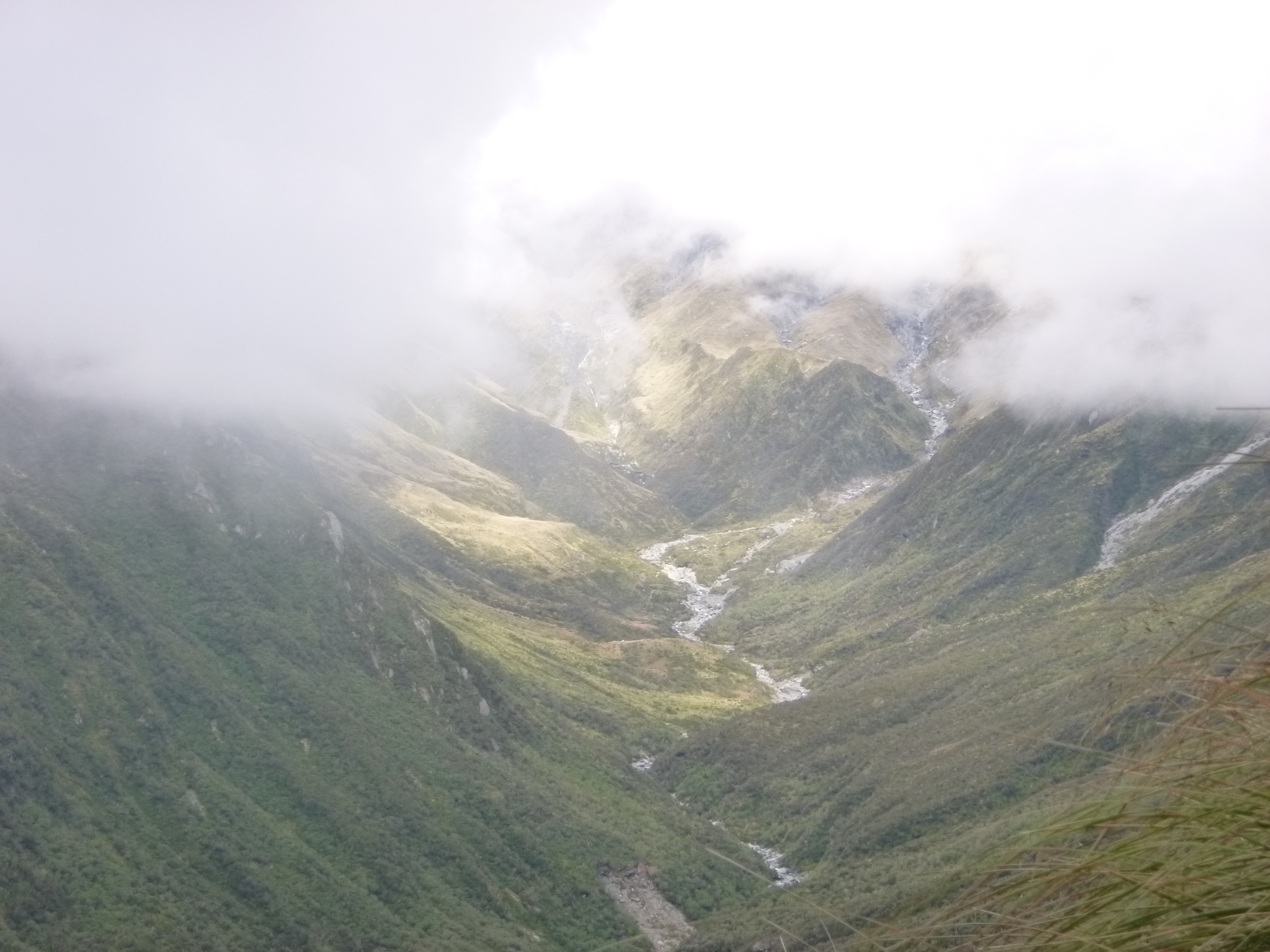
Upper reaches of the Tuke River.

The Tuke River is a river of the West Coast Region of New Zealand's South Island. It flows northwest from the Southern Alps, combining with the Dickson River to form the Mikonui River 15 kilometres southeast of Ross.

== Climate ==
Climate data for Tuke River (1981–2010)
Month	Jan	Feb	Mar	Apr	May	Jun	Jul	Aug	Sep	Oct	Nov	Dec	Year
Average rainfall mm (inches)	1,029 (40.5)	643 (25.3)	835 (32.9)	789 (31.1)	808 (31.8)	804 (31.7)	576 (22.7)	739 (29.1)	971 (38.2)	1,177 (46.3)	946 (37.2)	1,241 (48.9)	10,558 (415.7)
Source: NIWA

== See also ==
- List of rivers of New Zealand
