= Samuel Mitchell (VC) =

Recipient of the Victoria Cross

Samuel Mitchell VC
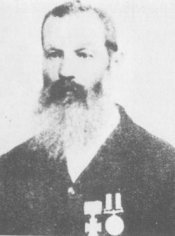
- Born: 8 September 1841; Aspley Guise, Bedfordshire, England
- Died: 16 March 1894 (aged 52); Mikonui River, New Zealand
- Burial place: Ross Cemetery, Westland
- Military career
- Allegiance: United Kingdom
- Branch: Royal Navy
- Service years: 1857–1865
- Rank: Boatswain's Mate
- Units: HMS Harrier
- Conflicts: Waikato-Hauhau Maori War
- Awards: Victoria Cross

Samuel Mitchell VC (8 September 1841 – 16 March 1894) was a Royal Navy sailor and a recipient of the Victoria Cross, the highest award for gallantry in the face of the enemy that can be awarded to British and Commonwealth forces.

== Early life ==
Samuel Mitchell was born in Aspley in Bedfordshire, England, on 8 September 1841. His father was a labourer who later became a minister in a Wesleyan church. Mitchell joined the Royal Navy in 1857, shortly before his 16th birthday.

== Military career ==
Mitchell served aboard HMS Crocodile and later the shore station in Portsmouth, HMS Excellent. In 1860 he was posted to HMS Harrier, which was destined for service on the Australian Station. Operating out of Sydney, the Australian Station area of operations encompassed both Australia and New Zealand.

In 1863, during the Waikato-Hauhau Maori War in New Zealand, the Harrier participated in an expedition up the Waikato River in support of British Army operations. Mitchell, who had been made captain of the foretop, was part of a naval brigade that was raised for service in the Invasion of the Waikato and which fought in the Battle of Rangiriri. By the end of the year, the fighting in the Waikato region had ceased but hostilities had shifted to Tauranga, and Mitchell's brigade moved there to participate in the Tauranga Campaign.

On 29 April 1864, a storming party of 150 marines and sailors, which included Mitchell and the captain of the Harrier, Commander Edward Hay, together with soldiers of the 43rd Light Infantry, succeeded in establishing themselves inside a fortified position known as the Gate Pa. Hay was wounded and despite being ordered to seek safety, Mitchell carried his commander to shelter. Although Hay died soon after from his wounds, he requested that Mitchell be recognised for his actions. Hay's senior officer, Commodore Sir William Wiseman, duly recommended him for the Victoria Cross (VC). The citation for his VC read:

For his gallant conduct at the attack at Te Papa, Tauranga, on the 29th of April last, in entering the Pah with Commander Hay, and when that Officer was mortally wounded, bringing him out, although ordered by Commander Hay to leave him, and seek his own safety. This man was at the time 'Captain of the Fore-top' of the "Harrier," doing duty as Captain's Coxswain; and Commodore Sir William Wiseman brings his name to special notice for this act of gallantry.

Mitchell was presented with his VC by the Governor of New South Wales in a ceremony attended by over 9,000 people at The Domain in Sydney on 24 September 1864. It was the second presentation of the VC to take place in Australia, and the first in New South Wales. Promoted to boatswain's mate, he continued to serve in the Royal Navy before ending his career in the military in mid-1865.

== Later life ==
Mitchell returned to New Zealand and settled on the West Coast of the South Island, and worked on the gold fields there. He later purchased land near Ross and took up farming. He drowned on 16 March 1894 when attempting to cross the Mikonui River, which was in flood at the time. His body was recovered three days later. He was survived by his wife, Agnes, whom he married in 1870, and ten children. He is buried in Ross Cemetery.

== The medal ==
Following his VC investiture, Mitchell's medal was placed in storage along with other possessions in his sea chest, which he had left with the proprietors of the boarding house that he stayed in while in Sydney. He intended to have his belongings forwarded to him once he had settled in New Zealand but lost contact with the boarding house proprietors. His medal remained missing until around 1912, when it was purchased at an auction in London. His family attempted to negotiate with the owner of the medal for the return of the medal but it took the intervention of the Duke of York, before they were successful and it was purchased in 1928. His medal is now displayed in the Hokitika Museum in Hokitika.

== Gallery ==
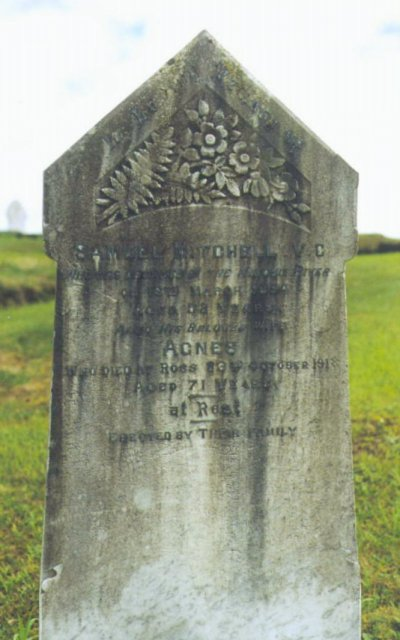
The headstone of Samuel and Agnes Mitchell

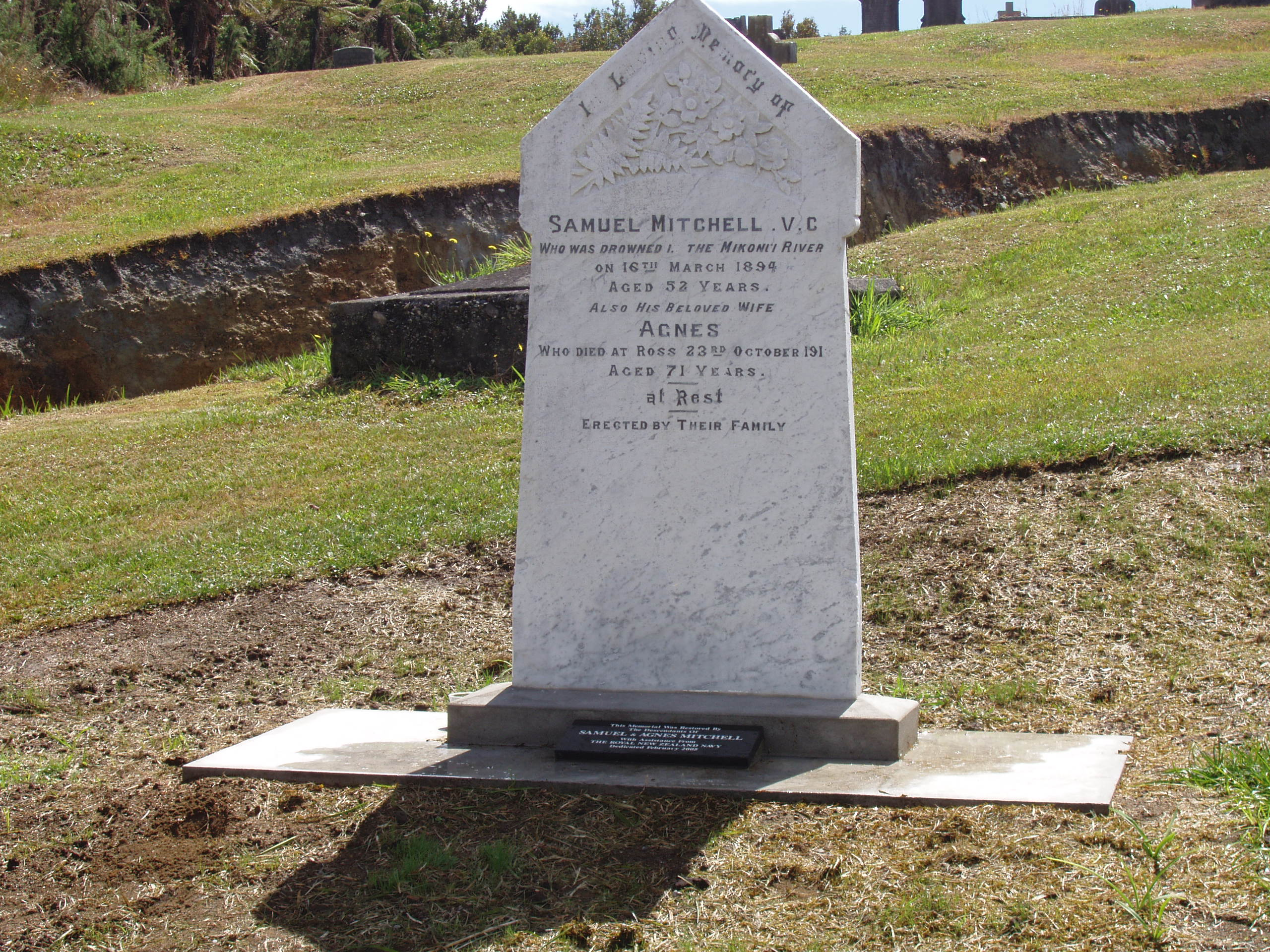
The restored headstone

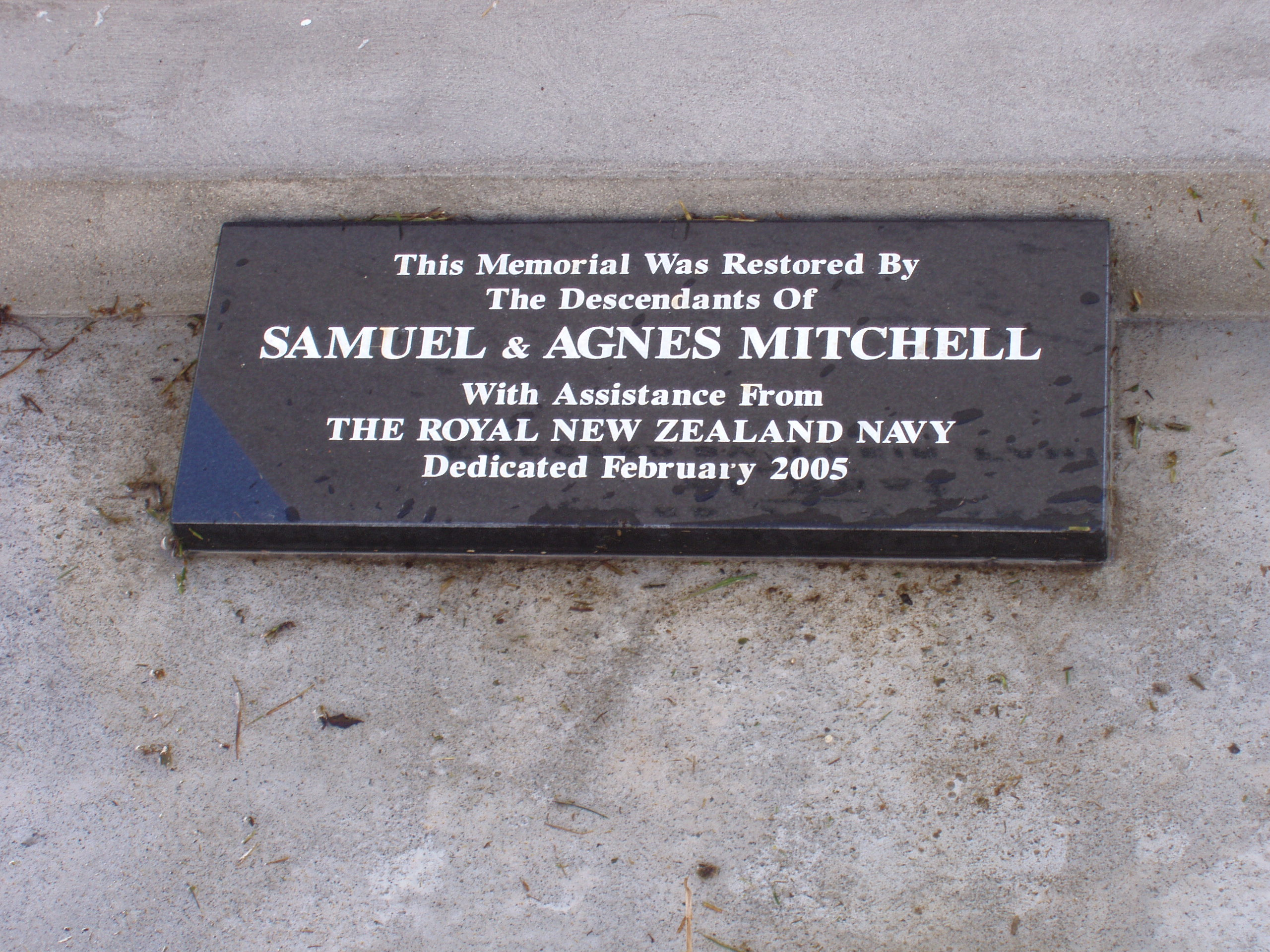
Detail of headstone
