= Swallow-class sloop =

Class overview
- Name: Swallow class
- Preceded by: Cruizer class
- Succeeded by: Racer class
- Built: 1854–1857
- In commission: 1856–1876
- Completed: 4
- Scrapped: 4

General characteristics
- Type: Sloop-of-war
- Displacement: 625 tons
- Tons burthen: 484 68/94 bm
- Length: 139 ft (42.4 m) (gundeck); 120 ft 6 in (36.7 m) (keel)
- Beam: 27 ft 10 in (8.5 m)
- Depth of hold: 13 ft 5 in (4.1 m)
- Installed power: 60 nhp; 182–224 ihp (136–167 kW)
- Propulsion: Single screw; two-cylinder horizontal single-expansion steam engine
- Sail plan: Barque rig
- Speed: Approximately 7 knots (13 km/h; 8.1 mph)
- Complement: 120
- Armament: 1 × 32 pdr gun (58 cwt) on pivot; 8 × 32 pdr (25 cwt) carronades

The Swallow-class sloop was a 9-gun wooden screw sloop class of four ships built for the Royal Navy between 1854 and 1857.

== Design ==
Built of a traditional wooden construction, the Swallow class were intended as "type of screw vessel below the Cruizer".

The class were armed with a single 32-pounder gun (58 cwt) gun on a pivot mount and eight 32-pounder (25 cwt) carronades on the broadside. These guns were all smoothbore muzzle-loading, and were little changed from the standard guns of Nelson's era.

Propulsion was provided by a two-cylinder horizontal single-expansion steam engine developing 60 nominal horsepower and an indicated horsepower of between 182 indicated horsepower (136 kW) and 224 indicated horsepower (167 kW). Propulsion was applied through a single screw and at maximum power under steam, top speed was about 7 knots (13 km/h; 8.1 mph). A barque rig of sails was carried, which meant the ships of the class had three masts with a square rig on the fore and main masts.

== Ships ==
The first two ships were ordered on 5 July 1852, Ariel on 2 April 1853 and Lyra on 3 April 1854.

| Name | Ship Builder | Laid down | Launched | Fate |
|---|---|---|---|---|
| Curlew | Deptford Dockyard | 19 October 1852 | 31 May 1854 | Sold for breaking on 39 August 1865 |
| Swallow | Pembroke Dockyard | 30 August 1853 | 12 June 1854 | Became a survey ship in 1861. Sold for breaking in December 1866 |
| Ariel | Pembroke Dockyard | November 1853 | 11 July 1854 | Sold for breaking 23 May 1865 |
| Lyra | Deptford Dockyard | 8 July 1854 | 26 March 1857 | Broken up in 1876 |
