= Racer-class sloop =

Boat classification

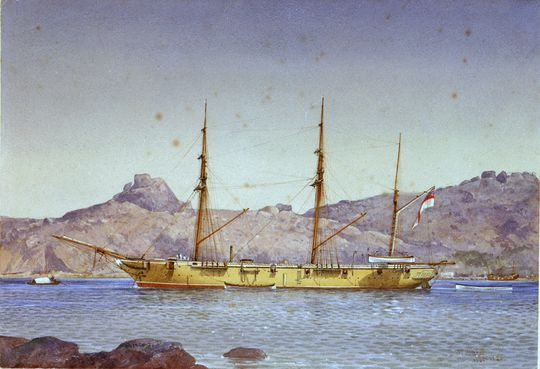
- HMS Icarus

Class overview
- Name: Racer class
- Preceded by: Swallow class
- Succeeded by: Greyhound class
- Built: 1855 - 1860
- In commission: 1856 - 1877
- Completed: 5
- Scrapped: 5

General characteristics
- Type: Sloop
- Displacement: 861 tons
- Tons burthen: 577 30/94 bm
- Length: 151 ft (46.0 m) (gundeck); 131 ft 3.75 in (40.0 m) (keel)
- Beam: 29 ft 1 in (8.9 m)
- Depth of hold: 15 ft 10 in (4.8 m)
- Installed power: 150 nhp; 461–617 ihp (344–460 kW)
- Propulsion: 2-cylinder horizontal single-expansion steam engine; Single screw
- Sail plan: Barque rig
- Speed: Approximately 10 knots (19 km/h)
- Complement: 120
- Armament: 1 × 32-pdr gun (58cwt) on pivot; 10 × 32-pdr (25cwt) carronades

The Racer-class sloop also known as the Cordelia class of swift cruisers was an 11-gun wooden screw sloop class of five ships built for the Royal Navy between 1855 and 1860.

== Design ==
Built of a traditional wooden construction, the Racer class were a lengthened version of the Swallow-class sloop, which in turn had been intended as "type of screw vessel below the Cruizer". The extra length gave greater speed, and combined with a considerable increase in power, this gave a speed of about 10 knots (19 km/h), rather more than the 7 knots (13 km/h) of the previous class.

The class were armed with a single 32-pounder gun (58 cwt) gun on a pivot mount and ten 32-pounder (25 cwt) carronades on the broadside. These guns were all smoothbore muzzle-loading, and were little changed from the standard guns of Nelson's era.

Propulsion was provided by a two-cylinder horizontal single-expansion steam engine developing 461 indicated horsepower (344 kW) and driving a single screw. At maximum power under steam, top speed was about 10 knots (19 km/h). A barque rig of sails was carried, which meant the ships of the class had three masts with a square rig on the fore and main masts.

== Ships ==
The first three ships were ordered on 3 April 1854, although both Cordelia and Gannet were ordered as Swallow-class sloops, with the design being changed before construction. Icarus was ordered on 3 February 1855 and Pantaloon was ordered on 1 April 1857.

| Name | Ship Builder | Laid down | Launched | Fate |
|---|---|---|---|---|
| Cordelia | Pembroke Dockyard | October 1855 | 3 July 1856 | Sold for breaking on 12 May 1870 |
| Racer | Deptford Dockyard | 1 October 1856 | 4 November 1857 | Broken up in 1876 |
| Gannet | Pembroke Dockyard | December 1856 | 29 December 1857 | Broken up in February 1877 |
| Icarus | Deptford Dockyard | 7 April 1857 | 22 October 1858 | Sold for breaking on 23 January 1875 |
| Pantaloon | Devonport Dockyard | 2 November 1857 | 26 September 1860 | Sold for breaking on 18 September 1867 |
