= USS Roebuck =

Gunboat of the United States Navy

History

United States
- Launched: 1856
- Acquired: 21 July 1861
- Commissioned: 8 November 1861
- Decommissioned: 17 October 1864
- Fate: Sold, 20 July 1865

General characteristics
- Tonnage: 455
- Length: 135 ft (41 m)
- Beam: 27 ft (8.2 m)
- Depth of hold: 14 ft 6 in (4.42 m)
- Propulsion: sail
- Complement: 69
- Armament: four 32-pounder guns

USS Roebuck was a barque used by the Union Navy during the American Civil War.

She was used by the Navy as a gunboat to patrol navigable waterways of the Confederacy to prevent the South from trading with other countries. At war's end, she was converted to a storeship before eventually being decommissioned.

== Service history ==
Roebuck, a bark rigged clipper ship built at New York in 1856 by Thomas Collyer, operated as a merchantman and made at least one voyage around Cape Horn to California. She was purchased by the Navy at New York City on 21 July 1861 from Reynolds and Cushman of that city; and commissioned at the New York Navy Yard on 8 November 1861, Act. Vol. Lt. George A. Trundy in command. Assigned to the South Atlantic Blockading Squadron, Roebuck took station off Charleston Bar late in November and continued blockade duty there, interrupted only by occasional brief visits to Port Royal, South Carolina, for supplies or repairs, until returning to New York on 15 July 1862 for repairs. The bark, back in fighting trim and now commanded by Acting Master John Sherrill, departed New York on 30 August to return to blockade duty off the Carolina coast. She reported for duty to Rear Admiral Samuel Francis Du Pont upon arriving at Port Royal on 5 September, but 2 days later she sailed for the Gulf of Mexico in compliance with new orders reassigning her to the East Gulf Blockading Squadron.

Reporting to Commodore J. L. Lardiner upon arriving at Key West, Florida, on the 19th, Roebuck was assigned to the blockade off St. Marks, Florida. On this duty, she caught the English schooner, Kate, on 27 December attempting to slip into the St. Marks River, laden with salt, coffee, copperas, and liquors from Havana, Cuba. On 1 February 1863, Roebuck relieved bark USS Ethan Allen on blockade station off St. Andrews Bay, Florida. On 20 March a party from the bark's launch landed to investigate a report that a vessel was loading with cotton up the Bay. The landing party was attacked by a guerrilla band and suffered heavy losses. Two boats from the ship captured the British schooner, Emma Amelia, on 2 May. Between 1 and 3 August, she picked up 10 bales which apparently had been thrown overboard by some blockade runner fleeing from capture. On the 28th, Acting Master Joseph B. Barclay was ordered to St. Andrews Bay to relieve Acting Master Sherrill in command of Roebuck.

Early in October, the bark returned to Key West to prepare for duty off Indian River, Florida. There she seized a small sloop on 13 December. Four days later she captured English schooner Ringdove bringing salt, coffee, tea, and whiskey from the Bahamas. On 11 January 1864, she made a prize of English schooner Suzan; and on the 19th, she caught British schooner Eliza attempting to escape from the Confederate coast laden with cotton. On 26 February, she brought to the British sloop, Two Brothers. British sloop, Nina, surrendered to the bark on the 27th, the same day she burned Nassau schooner, Rebel. On 1 March British schooner Lauretta, was added to Roebuck's prize list. On the 30th, a boat crew from Roebuck took possession of sloop, Last Resort, and, on 10 July, Nassau schooner, Terrapiss, struck her colors to the bark. Late that month, Roebuck, because of weakened rigging, proceeded to Tampa Bay where she acted as a storeship. There, yellow fever broke out among the crew. On 12 September the bark was ordered north to recuperate and she reached Portsmouth, New Hampshire, on the 28th. She decommissioned 17 October and was sold at public auction there to Mr. Bartlett on 20 July 1865.
