= Clown-class gunboat =

Class of twelve gunboats of the Royal Navy

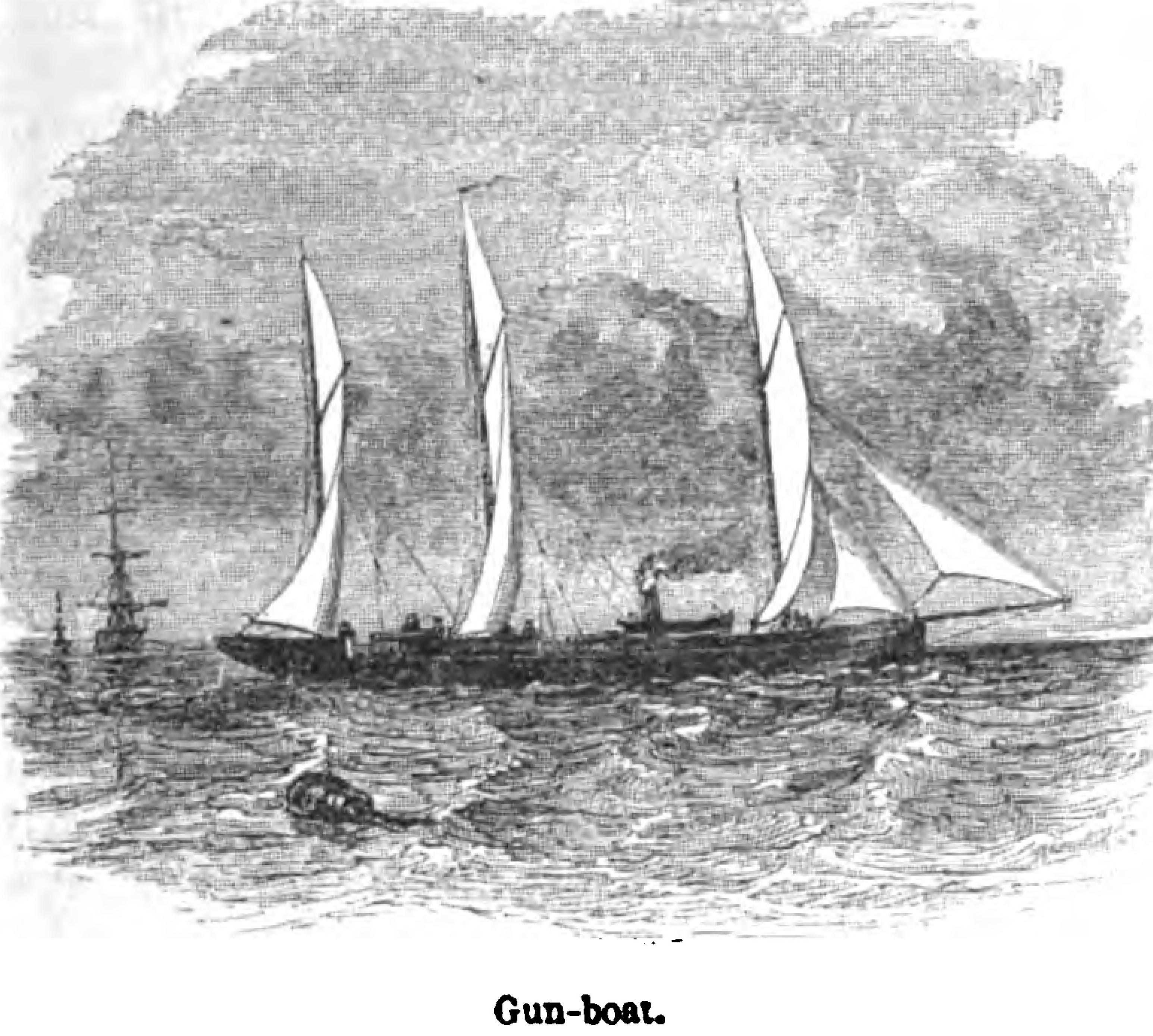
- A typical 'Crimea gunboat'

Class overview
- Name: Clown class
- Operators: Royal Navy
- Preceded by: Cheerful class
- Succeeded by: Algerine class
- Built: 1856
- In commission: 1856 – 1871
- Completed: 12
- Lost: 2

General characteristics
- Type: 'Crimean' gunboat
- Tons burthen: 232 80/94 tons bm
- Length: 110 ft (34 m) (gundeck); 95 ft 5.25 in (29.0894 m) (keel)
- Beam: 21 ft 10 in (6.65 m)
- Draught: 4 ft 0 in (1.22 m)
- Depth of hold: 6 ft 7 in (2.01 m)
- Installed power: 40 nominal horsepower; (Woodcock 145 ihp (108 kW))
- Propulsion: 1-cylinder horizontal direct-acting single-expansion steam engine; Single screw
- Speed: 7.5 kn (13.9 km/h)
- Crew: 30
- Armament: 1 × 68-pounder, 1 × 32-pounder SBML guns

The Clown-class gunboat was a class of twelve gunboats ordered by the Royal Navy in January 1856 for use in the Crimean War, although by the time they were completed, later that year, the Crimean War was over and some of these gunboats were sent to the Far East and took part in the Second Opium War.

== Design ==
The Clown class was an improved version of the preceding Cheerful class designed by W.H. Walker. The ships were wooden-hulled, with steam power as well as sails, and of particularly shallow draught (design draught 4 ft (1.2 m)) for coastal bombardment in shallow waters.

=== Sail plan ===
Ships of the class were provided with a typical "gunboat rig" of three gaff rigged masts with a total sail area of 4,889 sq ft (454.2 m^{2}).

=== Propulsion ===
One-cylinder horizontal direct-acting single-expansion steam engine built by John Penn and Sons, with two boilers, provided 40 nominal horsepower through a single screw, sufficient for 7.5 knots (13.9 km/h; 8.6 mph).

=== Armament ===
Ships of the class were armed with one 68-pounder and one 32-pounder smooth bore muzzle loading cannons.

== Ships ==
| Name | Ship builder | Launched | Fate |
|---|---|---|---|
| Fenella | W & H Pitcher, Northfleet | 19 May 1856 | Became a dredger at Woolwich in March 1867, renamed YC3 in 1868. Broken up on 14 November 1878 |
| Garnet | W & H Pitcher, Northfleet | 31 May 1856 | Breaking completed 25 May 1864 |
| Handy | W & H Pitcher, Northfleet | 31 May 1856 | Sold at Lagos in May 1868 |
| Hunter | W & H Pitcher, Northfleet | 7 June 1856 | Only partially fitted, never completed for sea. On the sale list in June 1869 but not sold till 1884 |
| Drake | Pembroke Dockyard | 8 March 1856 | Sold at Hong Kong on 9 February 1869 |
| Janus | Pembroke Dockyard | 8 March 1856 | Coal lighter December 1869, renamed YC.6. Sold in 1871 |
| Clown | William Cowley Miller, Toxteth Dock, Liverpool | 20 May 1856 | Became coal lighter YC.1 at Hong Kong in 1867. Renamed YC.6 in December 1869. Wrecked in a typhoon at Hong Kong on 2 September 1871 |
| Kestrel | William Cowley Miller, Toxteth Dock, Liverpool | 26 May 1856 | Sunk at the Battle of Taku Forts in June 1859, but salved. Sold on 16 March 1866 to Glover & Co., Yokohama, then resold to Japanese owners |
| Ready | Briggs & Company, Sunderland | 12 May 1856 | Fitted for reserve. Breaking completed on 25 January 1864 |
| Thrush | Briggs & Company, Sunderland | 12 May 1856 | Breaking completed on 14 March 1864 |
| Watchful | T & W Smith, North Shields | 4 June 1856 | Sold at Hong Kong on 1 February 1871 |
| Woodcock | T & W Smith, North Shields | 6 June 1856 | Sold at Hong Kong on 1 February 1871 |
