= Cheerful-class gunboat =

1855 class of British gunboats

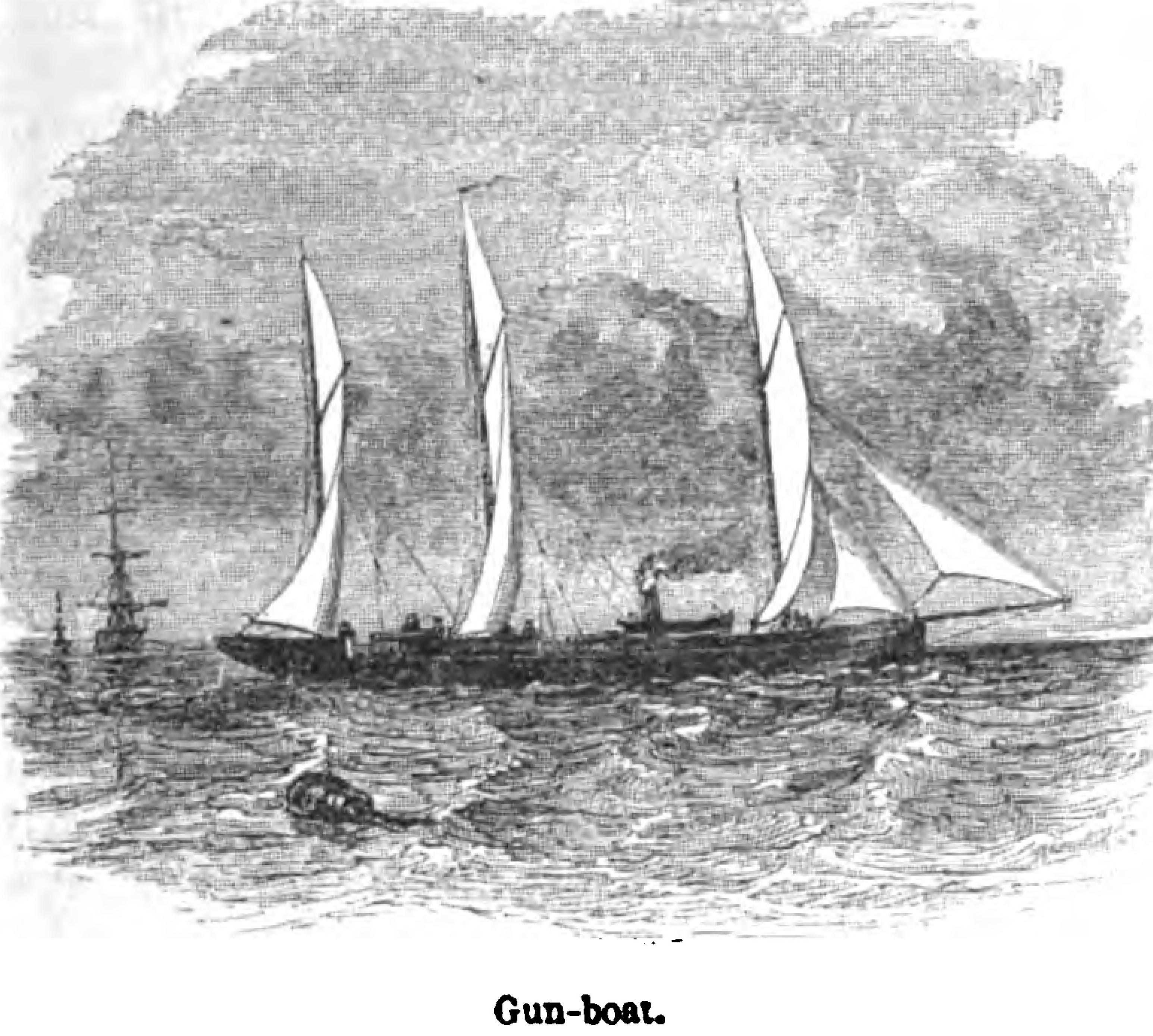
- A typical 'Crimea gunboat'

Class overview
- Name: Cheerful class
- Operators: Royal Navy
- Preceded by: Albacore class
- Succeeded by: Clown class
- Built: 1855
- In commission: 1855–1869
- Completed: 20

General characteristics
- Type: 'Crimean' gunboat
- Tons burthen: 211 64/94 tons bm
- Length: 100 ft (30 m) (gundeck); 85 ft 5.5 in (26.048 m) (keel)
- Beam: 21 ft 10 in (6.65 m)
- Draught: 6 ft 6 in (1.98 m)
- Depth of hold: 6 ft 7 in (2.01 m)
- Installed power: 20 nominal horsepower; (Onyx 92 ihp (69 kW))
- Propulsion: 1-cylinder horizontal direct-acting single-expansion steam engine; Single screw
- Speed: 6.5 kn (12.0 km/h)
- Crew: 30
- Armament: 2 × 32-pounder SBML gun

The Cheerful-class gunboat was a class of twenty gunboats built for the Royal Navy in 1855 for use in the Crimean War.

== Design ==
The Cheerful class was designed by W.H. Walker (who also designed the preceding Dapper and Albacore classes). The ships were of particularly shallow draft (Note: Winfield states a design draft of 4 ft (1.2 m) and an operational draft of 6 ft 6 in (1.98 m).) for coastal bombardment in the shallow waters of the Baltic and Black Sea during the Crimean War.

=== Propulsion ===
One-cylinder horizontal direct-acting single-expansion steam engines built by John Penn and Sons, with two boilers, provided 20 nominal horsepower through a single screw, sufficient for 6.5 knots (12.0 km/h; 7.5 mph).

=== Armament ===
Ships of the class were armed with two 32-pounder smooth bore muzzle loading cannons.

== Ships ==
Name	Ship builder	Launched	Fate
Cheerful	Deptford Dockyard	6 October 1855	Breaking completed at Haslar on 16 January 1869
Chub	Sheerness Dockyard	15 October 1855	Breaking completed at Haslar on 29 January 1869
Daisy	Thomas Westbrook, Blackwall	20 March 1856	Breaking completed at Haslar on 7 January 1869
Dwarf	Thomas Westbrook, Blackwall	8 April 1856	Broken up at Haslar in 1863
Blossom	John Laird, Sons & Company, Birkenhead	21 April 1856	Breaking completed at Haslar on 21 October 1864
Gadfly	John Laird, Sons & Company, Birkenhead	21 April 1856	Broken up in November 1864
Gnat	John Laird, Sons & Company, Birkenhead	10 May 1856	Broken up on 10 August 1864
Garland	John Laird, Sons & Company, Birkenhead	7 May 1856	Broken up in June 1864
Fidget	William Joyce, Greenwich	7 April 1856	Broken up at Haslar in 1863
Flirt	William Joyce, Greenwich	7 June 1856	Breaking completed at Haslar on 30 April 1864
Onyx	Young, Magnay & Company, Limehouse	3 April 1856	Dockyard craft (steam lump) 1869, sold in Jamaica on 8 July 1873
Pert	Young, Magnay & Company, Limehouse	3 April 1856	Breaking completed on 12 March 1864
Midge	Young, Magnay & Company, Limehouse	8 May 1856	Broken up in October 1864
Tiny	Young, Magnay & Company, Limehouse	8 May 1856	Completed breaking at Plymouth on 28 January 1864
Angler	Devonport Dockyard	8 March 1856	Breaking completed at Haslar on 21 January 1869
Ant	Devonport Dockyard	22 March 1856	Breaking completed at Haslar on 23 February 1869
Nettle	Pembroke Dockyard	9 February 1856	Broken up at Bermuda in October 1867
Pet	Pembroke Dockyard	9 February 1856	Hulked 1865, renamed C17 from c.1900, sold to Castle for breaking on 12 April 1904
Decoy	Pembroke Dockyard	21 February 1856	Breaking completed at Haslar on 8 February 1869
Rambler	Pembroke Dockyard	21 February 1856	Breaking completed at Haslar on 7 January 1869
