= Mikonui River =

River in New Zealand

Coordinates: 42°54′S 170°46′E

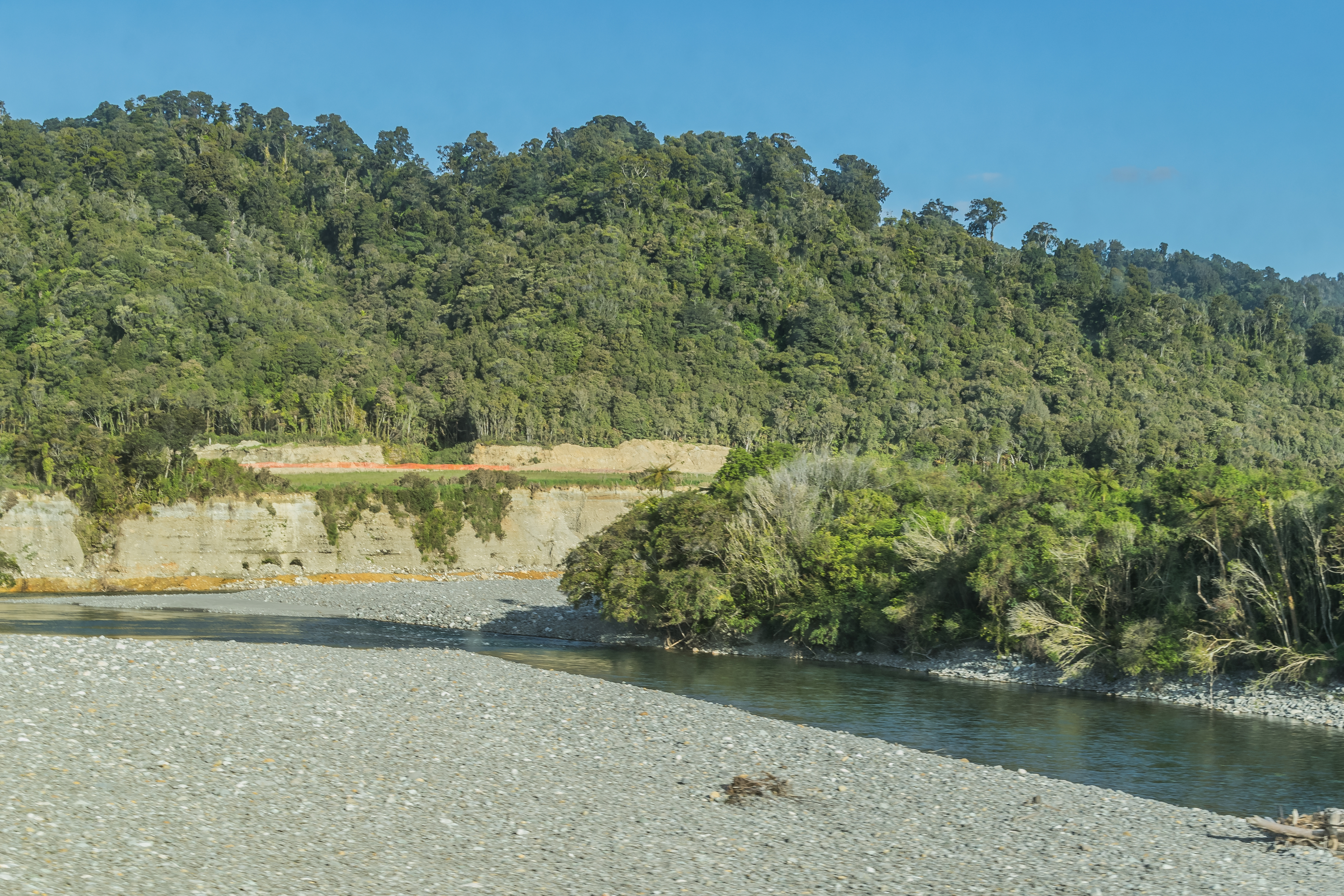

Location
- Country: New Zealand

Physical characteristics
- Source
  - location: Southern Alps
- Mouth
  - location: Tasman Sea
- Length: 25 km (16 mi)

The Mikonui River is a river of the West Coast Region of New Zealand's South Island. It flows northwest from its sources in the Southern Alps, reaching the Tasman Sea close to the township of Ross.

== Early settlers on the Mikonui ==
Charles Shearer (born 1826 in Denny, Scotland) and his wife Janet (born 1833 in Costdyke, Scotland) settled in Mikonui in 1868. In 1881 Charles advertised his Mikonui River water-race for sale in the West Coast Times for two hundred pounds.

== See also ==
- List of rivers of New Zealand
