= Cruizer-class sloop =

Royal Navy ship class in service (1852–1912)

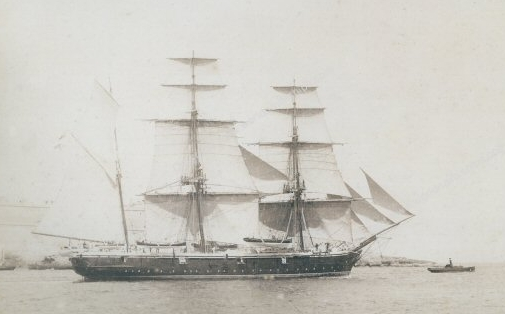
- Lark (ex-Cruizer), shown at Malta in 1894.

Class overview
- Name: Cruizer-class sloops
- Builders: Pembroke Royal Dockyard; Deptford Royal Dockyard
- Operators: Royal Navy
- Cost: £25,213 (Cruizer) – £36,743 (Alert)
- Built: 1852–1856
- In commission: 1852–1912
- Completed: 6
- Lost: 0

General characteristics
- Type: Wooden screw sloop
- Displacement: 1,045 tons (except Cruizer at 960 tons)
- Tons burthen: 747 51/94 bm
- Length: 160 ft (49 m) (gundeck); 140 ft 1.75 in (42.7165 m) (keel)
- Beam: 31 ft 10 in (9.70 m)
- Depth of hold: 17 ft 6 in (5.33 m)
- Installed power: Cruizer: 60 nominal horsepower; Others: 100 nominal horsepower
- Propulsion: Two-cylinder horizontal single-expansion steam engine (geared in Cruizer); Single screw
- Sail plan: Barque-rigged
- Speed: 6.6–8.8 knots (12.2–16.3 km/h; 7.6–10.1 mph) under power
- Armament: One 32-pounder (56 cwt) pivot gun; Sixteen 32-pounder (32 cwt) carriage guns

The Cruizer class was a class of six 17-gun wooden screw sloops built for the Royal Navy between 1852 and 1856.

== Design ==
The wooden sloops of the Cruizer class were designed under the direction of Lord John Hay, and after his "Committee of Reference" was disbanded, their construction was supervised by the new Surveyor of the Navy, Sir Baldwin Walker. A pair of ships named Cracker and Hornet had been ordered from Deptford and Woolwich in April 1847 as "steam gun schooners", with the intention of ordering four more. They were suspended in August 1847, and the new ships Cruizer and Hornet were re-ordered on 1 November 1850. Harrier was ordered in 1851, Fawn in 1852, and both Falcon and Alert on 2 April 1853. Cruizer differed from the rest of the class in having a lower-rated geared engine and a displacement of 960 tons, compared to 1,045 tons for the rest of the class.

=== Propulsion ===
Their two-cylinder horizontal single-expansion steam engines generated an indicated horsepower of between 132 hp (98 kW) and 434 hp (324 kW); driving a single screw, this gave a maximum speed of between 6.6 and 8.8 knots (12.2 and 16.3 km/h; 7.6 and 10.1 mph).

=== Sail plan ===
All ships of the class were built with a barque-rig sail plan.

=== Armament ===
All the ships of the class were provided with one 32-pounder (56 cwt) long gun on a pivot mount and sixteen 32-pounder (32 cwt) carriage guns in a broadside arrangement. Alert had her guns reduced to four Armstrong breech-loaders in 1874 as part of her conversion to an Arctic exploration vessel.

=== Development ===
The Greyhound-class sloop of 1855 was essentially a Cruizer-class design adapted to carry a more powerful engine developing an indicated horsepower of up to 786 hp (586 kW), giving a top speed under steam of 10 knots (19 km/h). The second and last ship of the Greyhound class, Mutine, had originally been ordered as the seventh vessel of the Cruiser class.

== Ships ==
Name	Ship builder	Launched	Fate
Cruizer	Deptford Royal Dockyard	19 June 1852	Renamed Cruiser in 1856 and Lark in 1893, sold for breaking at Malta in 1912
Hornet	Deptford Royal Dockyard	13 April 1854	paid off 22 September 1864 and broken up by White of Cowes in 1868
Harrier	Pembroke Royal Dockyard	13 May 1854	Broken up at Portsmouth in 1866
Fawn	Deptford Royal Dockyard	30 September 1856	Became a survey ship in 1876 and broken up in 1884
Falcon	Pembroke Royal Dockyard	10 August 1854	Sold for breaking at Plymouth on 27 September 1869
Alert	Pembroke Royal Dockyard	20 May 1856	Converted for Arctic survey in 1878 and loaned to the US Navy in 1884. Loaned again to the Canadian Government for survey and laid up in 1894

== Operational histories ==
=== Cruizer ===
From 1853 to 1856, Cruizer took part in the Baltic campaign of the Russian War. Renamed Cruiser in 1856, she served on the China station during the Second Opium War, including the taking of Canton and the attack on the Taku Forts on the Peiho river in 1859. Laid up in Portsmouth from 1861 to 1866, she recommissioned for the Mediterranean, where she served until 1870. She became part of the Steam Reserve in 1870, but in 1872 she recommissioned in Portsmouth for service as a sail training ship in the Mediterranean, for which role her engines were removed. In May 1893 she was renamed Lark and in 1912 she was sold at Malta.

=== Hornet ===
Hornet served in the Baltic in 1854 during the Russian War, and from 1854 until 1859 she served in the East Indies and in China, taking part in the Second Opium War. After a refit in 1859-1860 she recommissioned for the Cape of Good Hope Station and served both there and on the East Indies Station. She paid off at Portsmouth on 22 September 1864 and was broken up by White of Cowes in 1868.

=== Harrier ===
From 1854 to 1856 Harrier took part in the Russian War as part of the naval force in the Baltic. She served on the South Atlantic Station before refitting in Portsmouth in 1860. She recommissioned on 29 October 1860 for the Australia Station, where she took part in the New Zealand Wars. Her captain, Commander Edward Hay, was killed on 30 April 1864 during the storming of Gate Pā, and his Coxswain, Samuel Mitchell, was awarded the Victoria Cross for his bravery. Harrier paid off at Portsmouth on 31 March 1865 and was broken up the next year.

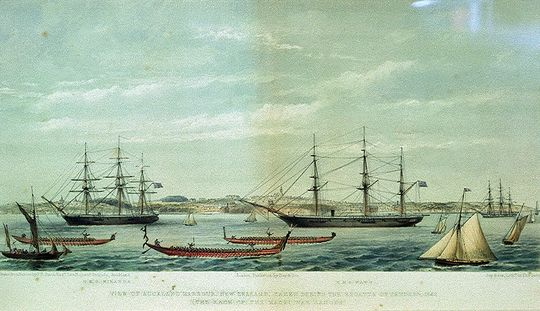
Fawn (right) and Miranda (left) during the Regatta of January, 1862 ("the race of the Maori war canoes")

=== Fawn ===
Fawn commissioned at Sheerness on 30 October 1859 and until 1863 served on the Australia Station. She refitted at Sheerness in 1863, and from 1864 to 1868 served on the North America and West Indies Station. After a second refit at Sheerness in 1869 she went to the Pacific Station, where she remained until 1875. In 1876 she was converted to a survey ship, and in this role she surveyed areas of the east coast of Africa, the Sea of Marmara and the Mediterranean. On 6 April 1883 she paid off, and she was broken up the next year.

=== Falcon ===
Falcon served in the Baltic during the Russian War before transferring to the North America and West Indies station, where she served until 1857. She refitted in Portsmouth in 1858, then served on the West Coast of Africa from 1859 to 1862. She refitted again in Portsmouth during 1863 before spending the rest of her active life on the Australia Station. During this period she took part in the New Zealand Wars. She paid off at Woolwich on 3 October 1868 and was sold on 27 September 1869 to C Marshall for breaking at Plymouth.

=== Alert ===
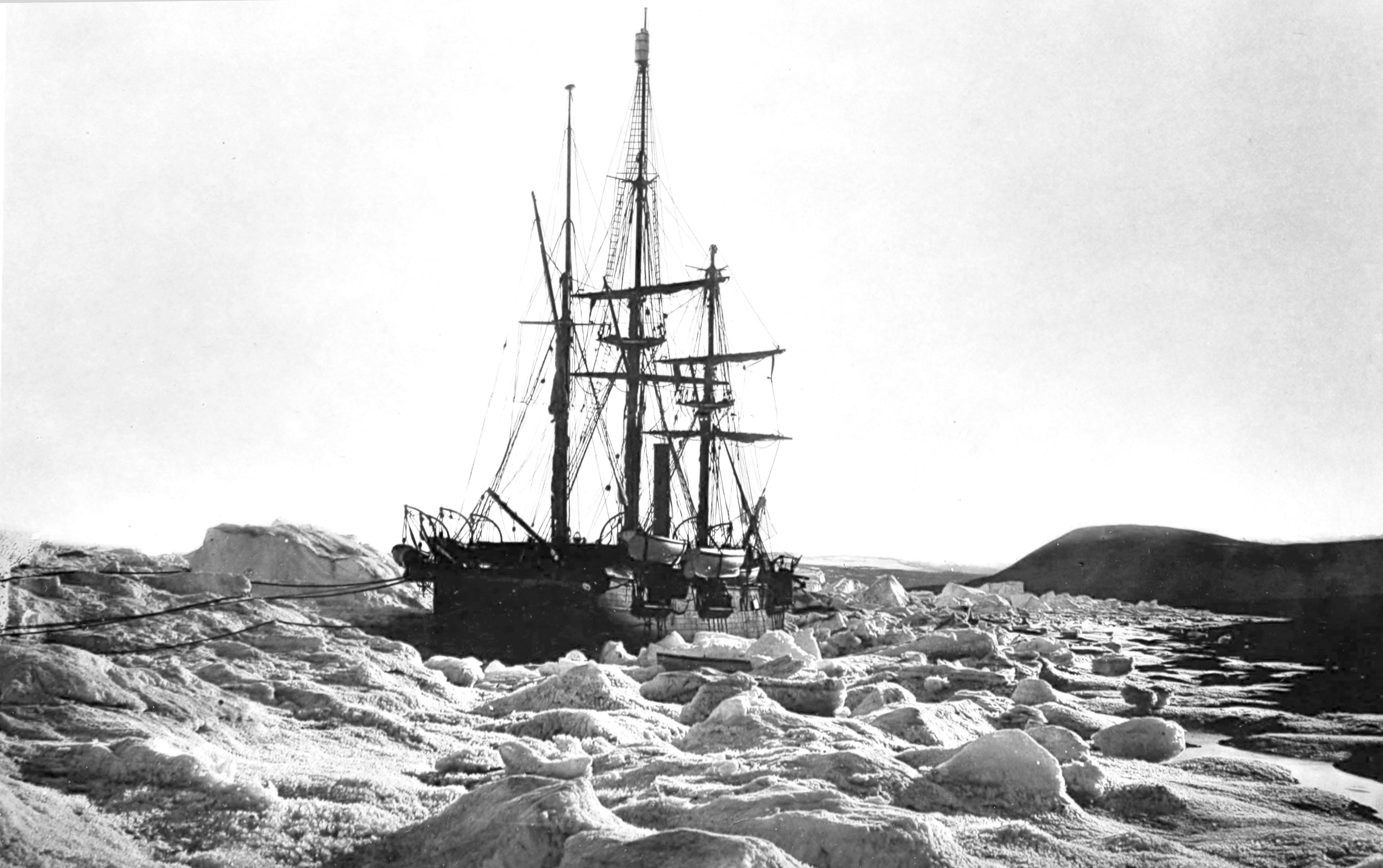
Alert in pack ice during the Arctic Expedition of 1876

From 1857 to 1868 Alert served on the Pacific Station, with a refit in Plymouth in 1862. In 1874 she was converted for Arctic exploration; her engines were replaced with R & W Hawthorn compound-expansion engines, she was reboilered to 60 pounds per square inch (410 kPa), she was reduced to four guns and her hull was strengthened with felt-covered iron and teak sheathing. The modifications caused her displacement to increase to 1,240 tons. During the British Arctic Expedition of 1875-76 Alert reached a latitude of 82°N, and her second-in-command, Commander Albert Hastings Markham, took a sledge party as far as 83° 20' 26"N, a record at the time. She was used to survey the Strait of Magellan, as well as Canadian and Australian waters, and on 20 February 1884 was loaned to the US Navy to assist in the rescue of the expedition under Adolphus Greely. In 1885 she was transferred again to the Canadian Government for survey in the Hudson Bay area, on completion of which she was employed as a lighthouse supply vessel and buoy tender. She was laid up in November 1894 and sold, the bill of exchange being forwarded to the Admiralty, since she was still officially on loan. Alert, Nunavut, the northernmost permanently inhabited place on earth, is named after her.
