= French ship Pacificateur (1811) =

80-gun ship of the line

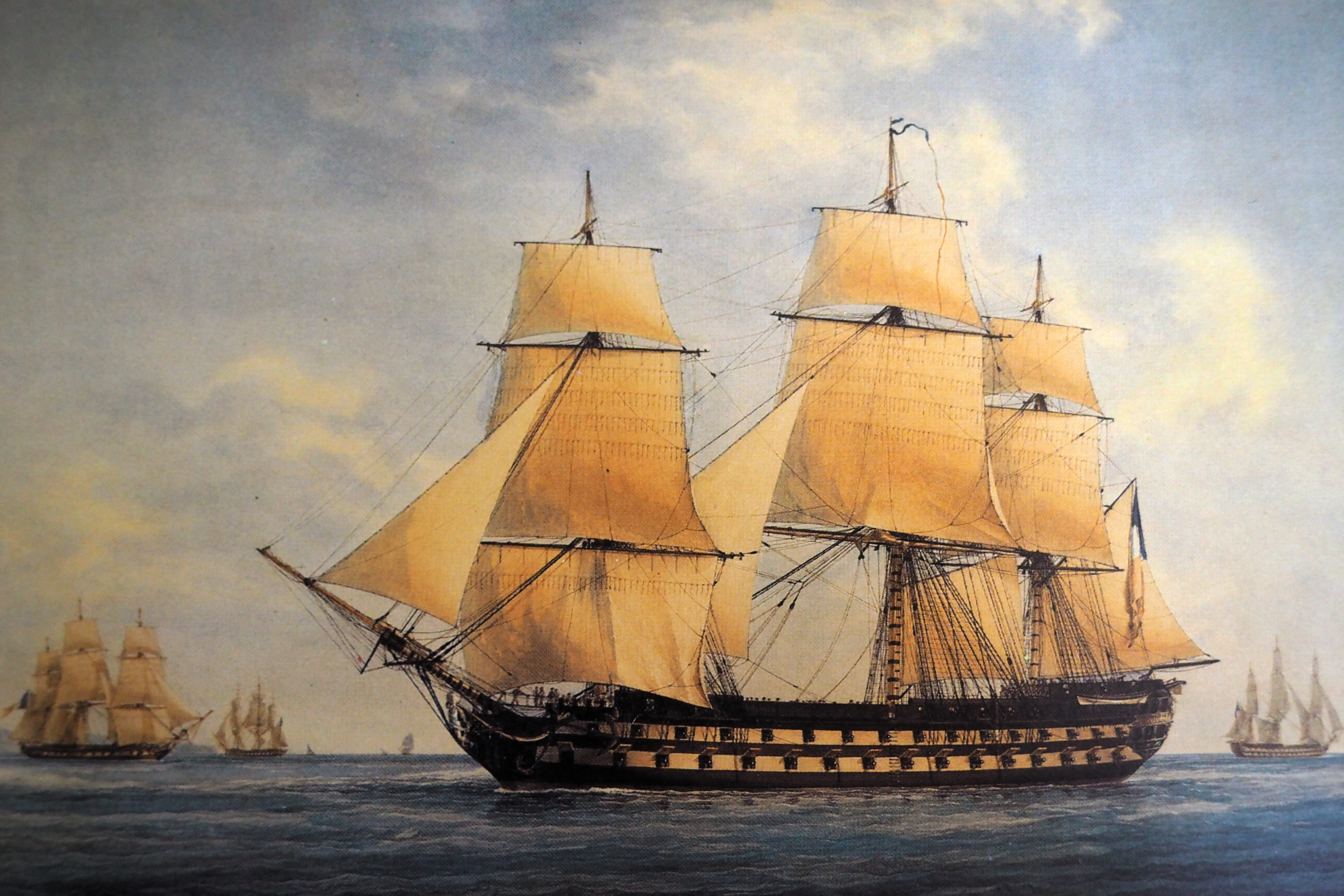
- The Robuste, sister ship of the Pacificateur

History

France
- Name: Pacificateur
- Namesake: Pacifier
- Ordered: July 1807
- Builder: Antwerp, Belgium
- Laid down: 1808
- Launched: 1811
- In service: 22 May 1811
- Stricken: 1824
- Fate: Condemned, 1824

General characteristics
- Class & type: Bucentaure-class ship of the line
- Displacement: 3,868 tonneaux
- Tons burthen: 2,034 port tonneaux
- Length: 59.28 m (194 ft 6 in)
- Beam: 15.27 m (50 ft 1 in)
- Draught: 7.8 m (25 ft 7 in)
- Depth of hold: 7.64 m (25 ft 1 in)
- Sail plan: Full-rigged ship
- Crew: 866 (wartime)
- Armament: 90 guns: Lower gun deck: 30 × 36 pdr guns; Upper gun deck: 32 × 24 pdr guns; Forecastle and Quarterdeck: 14 × 12 pdr guns & 14 × 36 pdr carronades

Pacificateur was a 3rd rank, 90-gun Bucentaure-class ship of the line built for the French Navy during the first decade of the 19th century. Completed in 1811, she played a minor role in the Napoleonic Wars.

== Description ==
Designed by Jacques-Noël Sané, the Bucentaure-class ships had a length of 59.28 metres (194 ft 6 in), a beam of 15.27 metres (50 ft 1 in) and a depth of hold of 7.64 metres (25 ft 1 in). The ships displaced 3,868 tonneaux and had a mean draught of 7.8 metres (25 ft 7 in). They had a tonnage of 2,034 port tonneaux. Their crew numbered 866 officers and ratings during wartime. They were fitted with three masts and ship rigged.

The muzzle-loading, smoothbore armament of the Bucentaure class consisted of thirty 36-pounder long guns on the lower gun deck and thirty-two 24-pounder long guns on the upper gun deck. The armament on the quarterdeck and forecastle varied as the ships' authorised armament was changed over the years that the Bucentares were built. Pacificateur was fitted with fourteen 12-pounder long guns and fourteen 36-pounder carronades.

== Construction and career ==
Pacificateur was ordered in July 1807 and named on 27 July. The ship was laid down in September in Antwerp and launched on 22 May 1811. She was commissioned the same day and completed in August. Pacificateur participated in the defence of Antwerp in March 1814 and was awarded to France when the Scheldt Squadron was divided on 1 August. The ship arrived in Brest on 20 September.

She was condemned on 28 October 1823 and used as a target ship during trials of Paixhans' 22-centimetre (8.7 in) canon-obusiers in January 1824. Pacificateur was scrapped later that year.

== Bibliography ==
- Roche, Jean-Michel (2005). Dictionnaire des bâtiments de la flotte de guerre française de Colbert à nos jours [Dictionary of French Warships from Colbert to Today]. Vol. 1: 1671-1870. Roche. ISBN 978-2-9525917-0-6. OCLC 165892922.
- Winfield, Rif and Roberts, Stephen S. (2015) French Warships in the Age of Sail 1786-1861: Design, Construction, Careers and Fates. Seaforth Publishing. ISBN 978-1-84832-204-2
