= French ship Sceptre (1810) =

Ship of the line of the French Navy

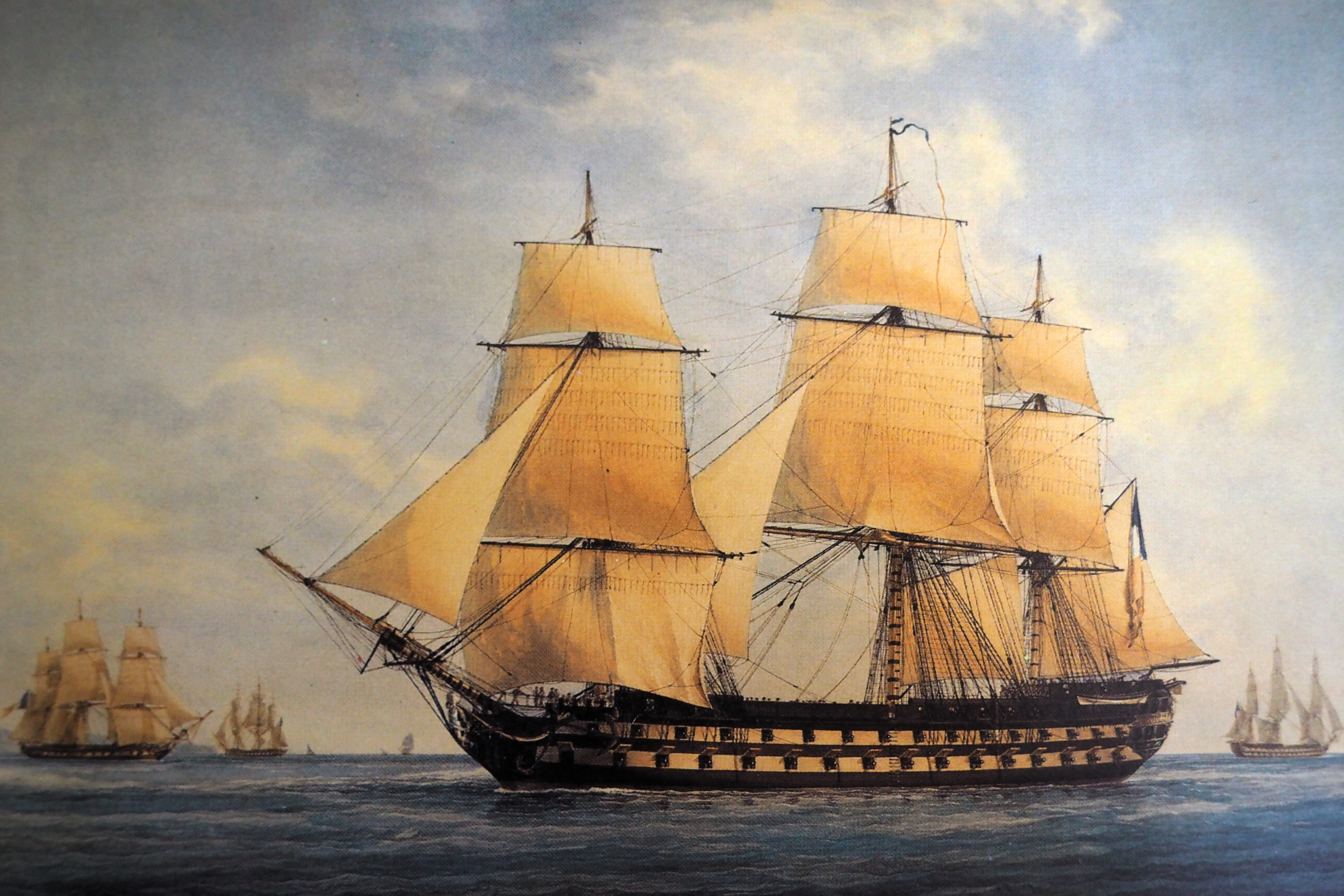
- The Robuste, sister-ship of the Sceptre

History

France
- Name: Sceptre
- Ordered: 26 December 1808
- Builder: Toulon
- Laid down: 1809
- Launched: 15 August 1810
- Stricken: 1828
- Fate: Burnt 1830 in Toulon

General characteristics
- Class & type: Bucentaure-class ship of the line
- Displacement: 3,868 tonneaux
- Tons burthen: 2,034 port tonneaux
- Length: 59.28 m (194 ft 6 in)
- Beam: 15.27 m (50 ft 1 in)
- Draught: 7.8 m (25 ft 7 in)
- Depth of hold: 7.64 m (25 ft 1 in)
- Sail plan: Full-rigged ship
- Crew: 866 (wartime)
- Armament: 90 guns: Lower gun deck: 30 × 36 pdr guns; Upper gun deck: 32 × 24 pdr guns; Forecastle and Quarterdeck: 14 × 12 pdr guns & 14 × 36 pdr carronades

Sceptre was a 3rd rank, 90-gun Bucentaure-class ship of the line built for the French Navy during the first decade of the 19th century. Completed in 1811, she played a minor role in the Napoleonic Wars. The ship was condemned in 1828, converted into a barracks ship and destroyed by fire in 1830.

== Description ==
Designed by Jacques-Noël Sané, the Bucentaure-class ships had a length of 59.28 metres (194 ft 6 in), a beam of 15.27 metres (50 ft 1 in) and a depth of hold of 7.64 metres (25 ft 1 in). The ships displaced 3,868 tonneaux and had a mean draught of 7.8 metres (25 ft 7 in). They had a tonnage of 2,034 port tonneaux. Their crew numbered 866 officers and ratings during wartime. They were fitted with three masts and ship rigged.

The muzzle-loading, smoothbore armament of the Bucentaure class consisted of thirty 36-pounder long guns on the lower gun deck and thirty-two 24-pounder long guns on the upper gun deck. The armament on the quarterdeck and forecastle varied as the ships' authorised armament was changed over the years that the Bucentares were built. Sceptre was fitted with fourteen 12-pounder long guns and fourteen 36-pounder carronades.

== Construction and career ==
Sceptre was ordered on 26 December 1808 and named on 27 March. The ship was laid down in March 1809 at the Arsenal de Toulon and launched on 15 August 1808. She was commissioned on 17 March 1811 and completed later that month. Sceptre was condemned on 10 March 1828 and hulked as a barracks ship before she was destroyed by fire on 16 January 1830.
