= French ship Centaure (1818) =

Ship of the line of the French Navy

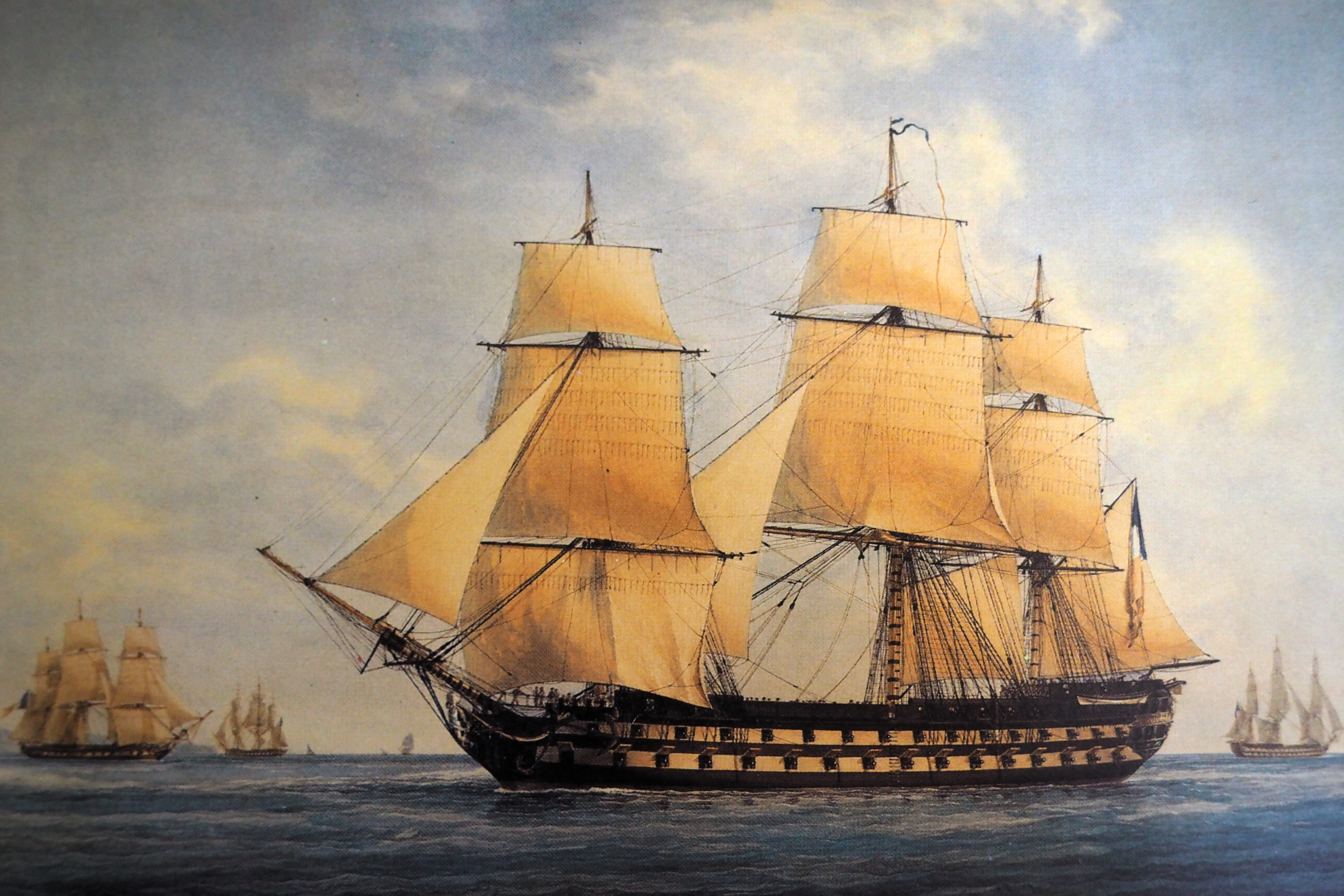
- The Robuste, sister-ship of the Centaure

History

France
- Name: Centaure
- Namesake: Centaure
- Ordered: 25 November 1811
- Builder: Cherbourg
- Laid down: 2 November 1811
- Launched: 8 January 1818
- In service: 10 February 1823
- Renamed: Santi-Pietri, 14 October 1823
- Fate: Destroyed by fire 4 January 1862

General characteristics
- Class & type: Bucentaure-class ship of the line
- Displacement: 3,868 tonneaux
- Tons burthen: 2,034 port tonneaux
- Length: 59.28 m (194 ft 6 in)
- Beam: 15.27 m (50 ft 1 in)
- Draught: 7.8 m (25 ft 7 in)
- Depth of hold: 7.64 m (25 ft 1 in)
- Sail plan: Full-rigged ship
- Crew: 866 (wartime)
- Armament: 90 guns: Lower gun deck: 30 × 36 pdr guns; Upper gun deck: 32 × 24 pdr guns; Forecastle and Quarterdeck: 14 × 12 pdr guns & 14 × 36 pdr carronades

Centaure was a 3rd rank, 90-gun Bucentaure-class ship of the line built for the French Navy during the 1810s. Completed in 1818, she played a minor role in the Spanish expedition in 1823.

== Description ==
Designed by Jacques-Noël Sané, the Bucentaure-class ships had a length of 59.28 metres (194 ft 6 in), a beam of 15.27 metres (50 ft 1 in) and a depth of hold of 7.64 metres (25 ft 1 in). The ships displaced 3,868 tonneaux and had a mean draught of 7.8 metres (25 ft 7 in). They had a tonnage of 2,034 port tonneaux. Their crew numbered 866 officers and ratings during wartime. They were fitted with three masts and ship rigged.

The muzzle-loading, smoothbore armament of the Bucentaure class consisted of thirty 36-pounder long guns on the lower gun deck and thirty-two 24-pounder long guns on the upper gun deck. The armament on the quarterdeck and forecastle varied as the ships' authorised armament was changed over the years that the Bucentares were built. Centaure was fitted with fourteen 12-pounder long guns and fourteen 36-pounder carronades.

== Construction and career ==
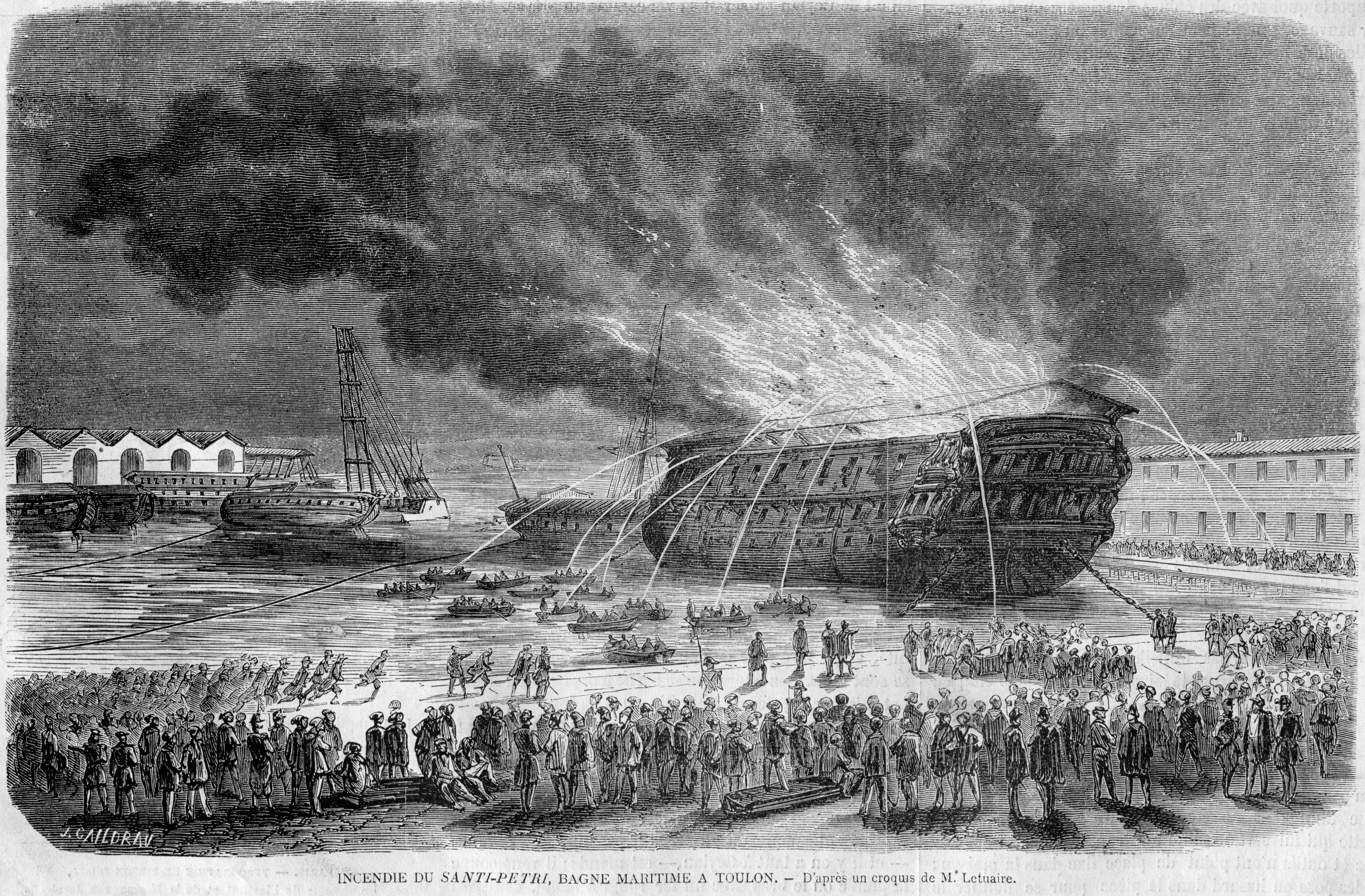
Burning of the Santi Petri convict-ship at Toulon

Centaure was ordered in 1811, laid down on 2 November 1811 at the Arsenal de Cherbourg, and named on 25 November. The ship was launched on 8 January 1818. She was completed in April and commissioned on 10 February 1823. Centaure participated in operations of the Spanish expedition later that year, along with Trident and Sirène, silencing Fort Santi-Pietri in Cádiz on 20 September. On 14 October, she was renamed Santi-Pietri to commemorate the event. The ship was used as a troopship in 1836, condemned on 5 November 1849 and hulked as a prison ship before she was destroyed by fire on 4 January 1862.

== Bibliography ==
- Roche, Jean-Michel (2005). Dictionnaire des bâtiments de la flotte de guerre française de Colbert à nos jours [Dictionary of French Warships from Colbert to Today]. Vol. 1: 1671-1870. Roche. ISBN 978-2-9525917-0-6. OCLC 165892922.
- Winfield, Rif and Roberts, Stephen S. (2015) French Warships in the Age of Sail 1786-1861: Design, Construction, Careers and Fates. Seaforth Publishing. ISBN 978-1-84832-204-2
