= French ship Magnifique (1814) =

Ship of the line of the French Navy

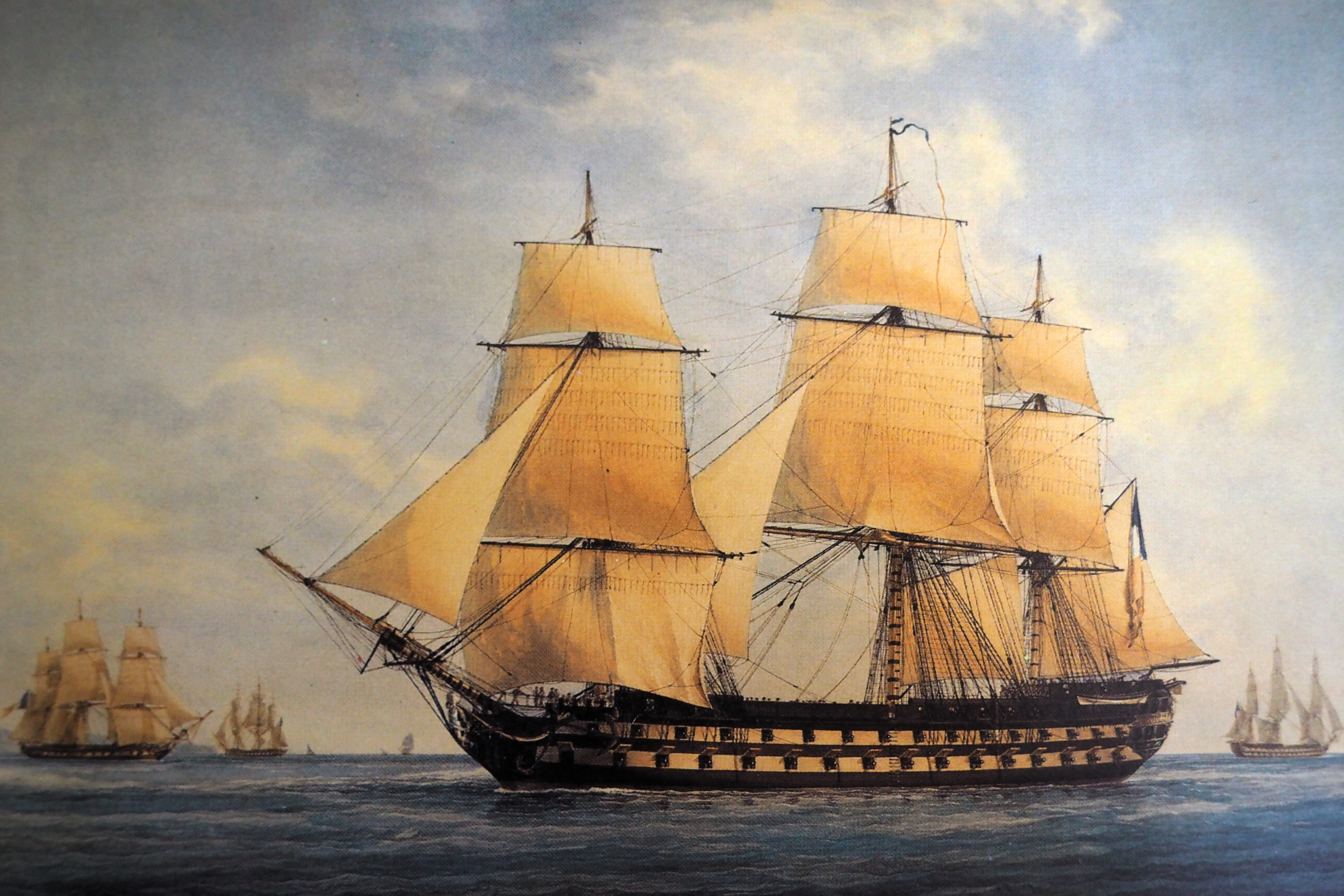
- The Robuste, sister-ship of Magnifique

History

France
- Name: Magnifique
- Namesake: Magnificent
- Ordered: 29 October 1807
- Builder: Lorient
- Laid down: January 1809
- Launched: 29 October 1814
- Stricken: 23 September 1837
- Fate: Broken up, 1837

General characteristics
- Class & type: Bucentaure-class ship of the line
- Displacement: 3,868 tonneaux
- Tons burthen: 2,034 port tonneaux
- Length: 59.28 m (194 ft 6 in)
- Beam: 15.27 m (50 ft 1 in)
- Draught: 7.8 m (25 ft 7 in)
- Depth of hold: 7.64 m (25 ft 1 in)
- Sail plan: Full-rigged ship
- Crew: 866 (wartime)
- Armament: 90 guns: Lower gun deck: 30 × 36 pdr guns; Upper gun deck: 32 × 24 pdr guns; Forecastle and Quarterdeck: 14 × 12 pdr guns & 14 × 36 pdr carronades

Magnifique was a 3rd rank, 90-gun Bucentaure-class ship of the line built for the French Navy during the first decade of the 19th century. Completed in 1814, she was decommissioned the following year and was never recommissioned. The ship was scrapped in 1837.

== Description ==
Designed by Jacques-Noël Sané, the Bucentaure-class ships had a length of 59.28 metres (194 ft 6 in), a beam of 15.27 metres (50 ft 1 in) and a depth of hold of 7.64 metres (25 ft 1 in). The ships displaced 3,868 tonneaux and had a mean draught of 7.8 metres (25 ft 7 in). They had a tonnage of 2,034 port tonneaux. Their crew numbered 866 officers and ratings during wartime. They were fitted with three masts and ship rigged.

The muzzle-loading, smoothbore armament of the Bucentaure class consisted of thirty 36-pounder long guns on the lower gun deck and thirty-two 24-pounder long guns on the upper gun deck. The armament on the quarterdeck and forecastle varied as the ships' authorised armament was changed over the years that the Bucentares were built. Magnifique was fitted with fourteen 12-pounder long guns and fourteen 36-pounder carronades.

== Construction and career ==
Magnifique was ordered on 29 October 1807 and named on 25 November. The ship was laid down in December 1809 at the Arsenal de Lorient and launched on 29 October 1814. She was commissioned on 1 November 1814 and completed later that month. Magnifique was decommissioned on 3 February 1815 and was refitted at Brest in 1831. The ship was struck on 23 September 1837 and broken up in December.

== Bibliography ==
- Roche, Jean-Michel (2005). Dictionnaire des bâtiments de la flotte de guerre française de Colbert à nos jours [Dictionary of French Warships from Colbert to Today]. Vol. 1: 1671-1870. Roche. ISBN 978-2-9525917-0-6. OCLC 165892922.
- Winfield, Rif and Roberts, Stephen S. (2015) French Warships in the Age of Sail 1786-1861: Design, Construction, Careers and Fates. Seaforth Publishing. ISBN 978-1-84832-204-2
