= French ship Neptune (1818) =

Ship of the line of the French Navy

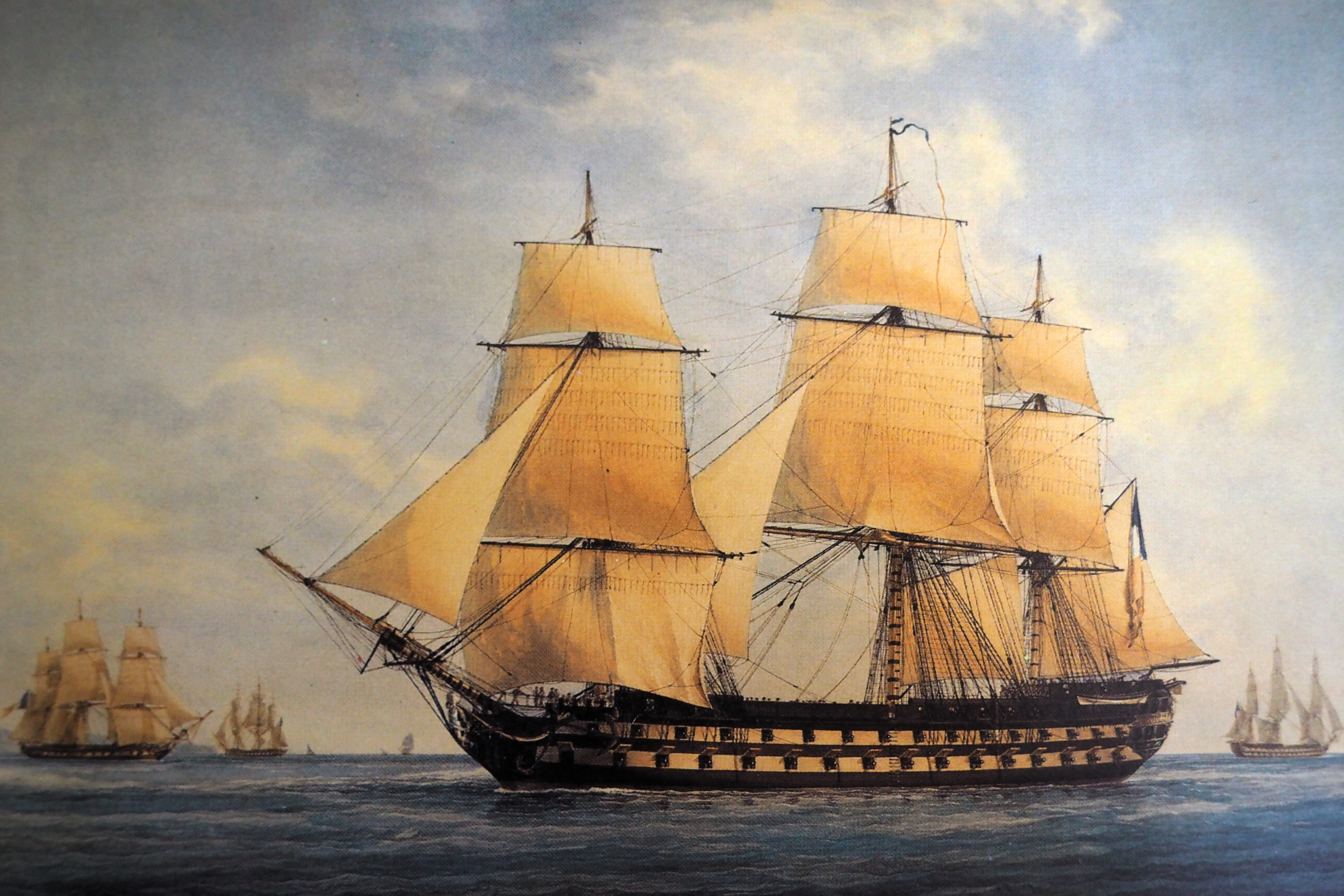
- The Robuste, sister-ship of the Neptune

History

France
- Name: Neptune
- Namesake: Neptune
- Ordered: 23 July 1810
- Builder: Lorient
- Laid down: 1 December 1810
- Launched: 21 March 1818
- Stricken: 1865
- Fate: Broken up 1868

General characteristics
- Class & type: Bucentaure-class ship of the line
- Displacement: 3,868 tonneaux
- Tons burthen: 2,034 port tonneaux
- Length: 59.28 m (194 ft 6 in)
- Beam: 15.27 m (50 ft 1 in)
- Draught: 7.8 m (25 ft 7 in)
- Depth of hold: 7.64 m (25 ft 1 in)
- Sail plan: Full-rigged ship
- Crew: 866 (wartime)
- Armament: 90 guns: Lower gun deck: 30 × 36 pdr guns; Upper gun deck: 32 × 24 pdr guns; Forecastle and Quarterdeck: 14 × 12 pdr guns & 14 × 36 pdr carronades

Neptune was a 3rd rank, 90-gun Bucentaure-class ship of the line built for the French Navy during the 1810s. Completed in 1818, she was not commissioned until 1839. The ship was stricken from the navy list in 1858 and became a prison ship before being scrapped in 1868.

== Description ==
Designed by Jacques-Noël Sané, the Bucentaure-class ships had a length of 59.28 metres (194 ft 6 in), a beam of 15.27 metres (50 ft 1 in) and a depth of hold of 7.64 metres (25 ft 1 in). The ships displaced 3,868 tonneaux and had a mean draught of 7.8 metres (25 ft 7 in). They had a tonnage of 2,034 port tonneaux. Their crew numbered 866 officers and ratings during wartime. They were fitted with three masts and ship rigged.

The muzzle-loading, smoothbore armament of the Bucentaure class consisted of thirty 36-pounder long guns on the lower gun deck and thirty-two 24-pounder long guns on the upper gun deck. The armament on the quarterdeck and forecastle varied as the ships' authorised armament was changed over the years that the Bucentares were built. Neptune was fitted with fourteen 12-pounder long guns and fourteen 36-pounder carronades.

== Construction and career ==
Neptune was ordered on 23 July 1810 as Brabançon and laid down on 1 December at the Arsenal de Lorient. The ship was renamed Neptune on 30 August 1814 during the Bourbon Restoration, reverted to Brabançon on 23 March 1815 during the Hundred Days and finally back to Neptune on 15 July after Napoleon was defeated at the Battle of Waterloo. The ship was launched on 21 March 1818 and completed in June. She was commissioned on 16 August 1839 later that month.

Neptune was part of a squadron under Admiral Hugon that cruised the coast of North Africa, together with Montebello and Andromaque in June 1841. The ship was struck on 11 January 1858 and used as a prison ship in Toulon harbour between 1865 and 1868 when she was broken up.
