= French ship Diadème (1811) =

Ship of the line of the French Navy

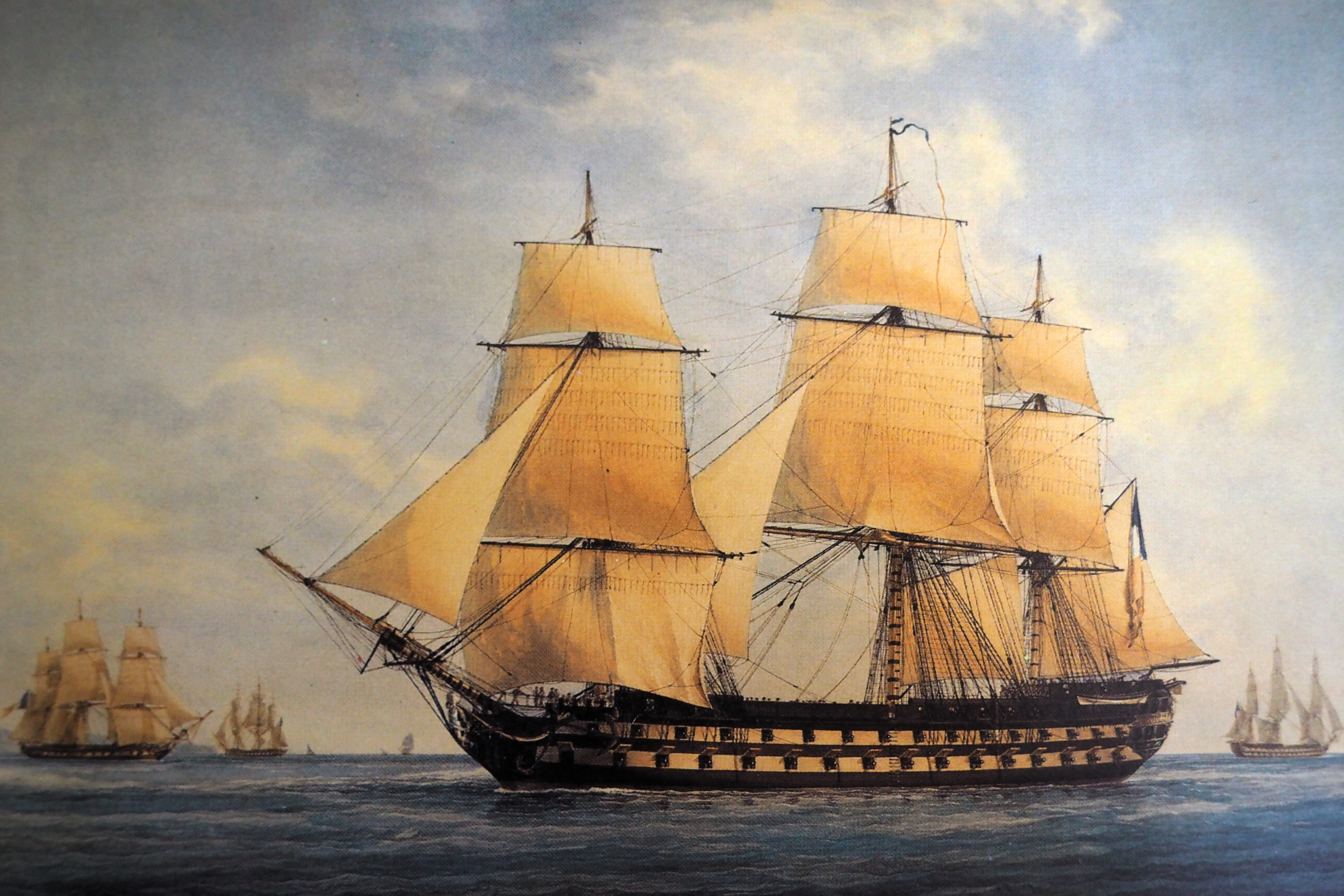
- The Robuste, sister-ship of the Diadème

History

France
- Name: Diadème
- Namesake: Diadem
- Ordered: 29 October 1807
- Builder: Lorient
- Laid down: November 1807
- Launched: 30 November 1811
- Stricken: 21 January 1856
- Fate: Broken up 1868

General characteristics
- Class & type: Bucentaure-class ship of the line
- Displacement: 3,868 tonneaux
- Tons burthen: 2,034 port tonneaux
- Length: 59.28 m (194 ft 6 in)
- Beam: 15.27 m (50 ft 1 in)
- Draught: 7.8 m (25 ft 7 in)
- Depth of hold: 7.64 m (25 ft 1 in)
- Sail plan: Full-rigged ship
- Crew: 866 (wartime)
- Armament: 90 guns: Lower gun deck: 30 × 36 pdr guns; Upper gun deck: 32 × 24 pdr guns; Forecastle and Quarterdeck: 14 × 12 pdr guns & 14 × 36 pdr carronades

Diadème was a 3rd rank, 90-gun Bucentaure-class ship of the line built for the French Navy during the first decade of the 19th century. Completed in 1811, she played a minor role in the Napoleonic Wars.

== Description ==
Designed by Jacques-Noël Sané, the Bucentaure-class ships had a length of 59.28 metres (194 ft 6 in), a beam of 15.27 metres (50 ft 1 in) and a depth of hold of 7.64 metres (25 ft 1 in). The ships displaced 3,868 tonneaux and had a mean draught of 7.8 metres (25 ft 7 in). They had a tonnage of 2,034 port tonneaux. Their crew numbered 866 officers and ratings during wartime. They were fitted with three masts and ship rigged.

The muzzle-loading, smoothbore armament of the Bucentaure class consisted of thirty 36-pounder long guns on the lower gun deck and thirty-two 24-pounder long guns on the upper gun deck. The armament on the quarterdeck and forecastle varied as the ships' authorised armament was changed over the years that the Bucentares were built. Diadème was fitted with fourteen 12-pounder long guns and fourteen 36-pounder carronades.

== Construction and career ==
Diadème was ordered on 29 October 1807 and laid down in November 1807 at the Arsenal de Lorient. The ship was named on 1 September 1810 and launched on 30 November 1811. She was commissioned on 1 January 1812 and completed in March. Diadème was decommissioned on 11 July 1814 during the Bourbon Restoration. She had major refits in 1822 and 1833, and was recommissioned in 1836. The ship was assigned to the Mediterranean Squadron in 1841. Diadème was struck on 21 January 1856 and was hulked as a barracks ship until she was broken up in 1868.
