= French ship Jupiter (1831) =

Ship of the line of the French Navy

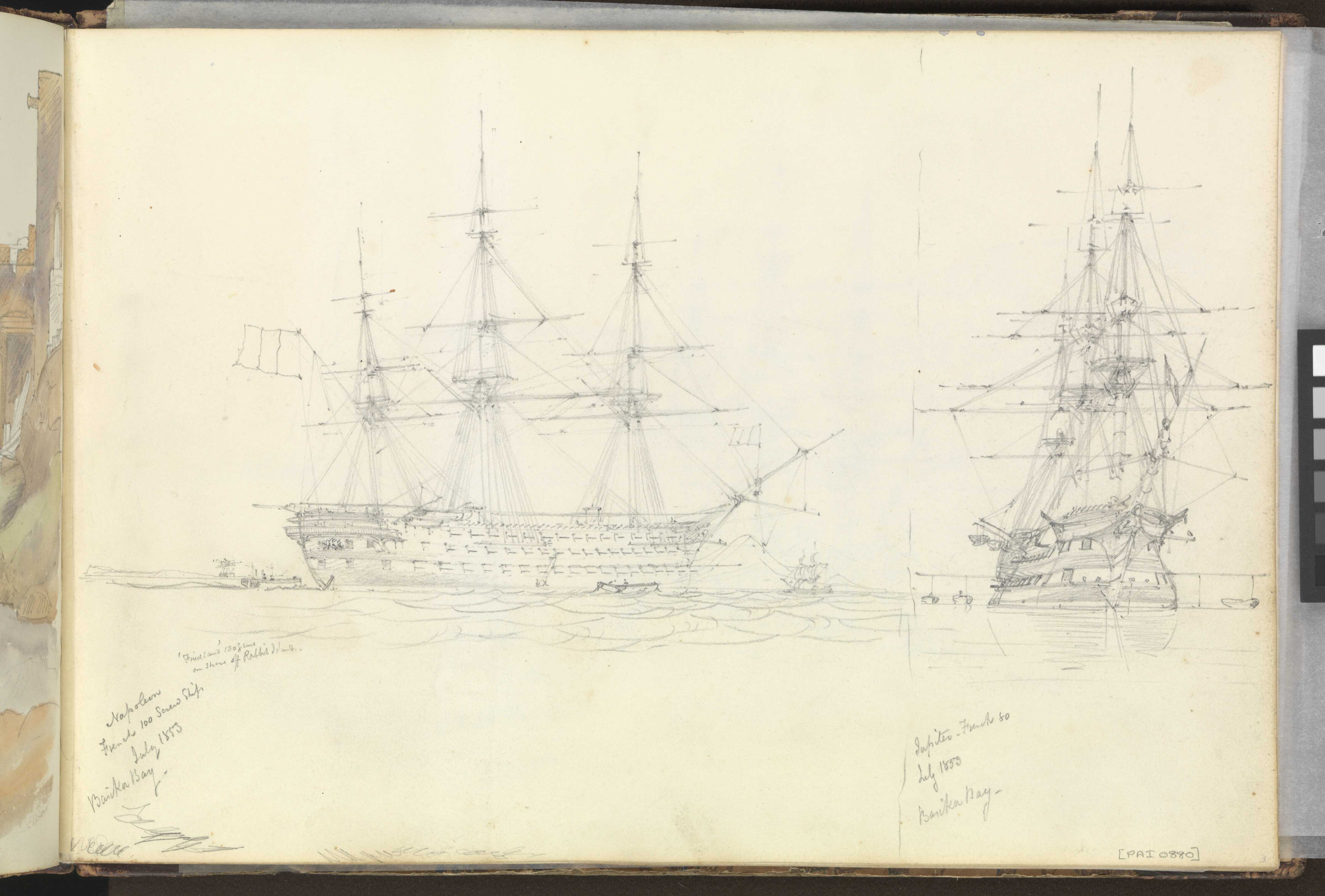
- Napoléon, and Jupiter, in Besika Bay, July 1853

History

France
- Name: Jupiter
- Namesake: Jupiter
- Ordered: 25 November 1811
- Builder: Cherbourg
- Laid down: 5 November 1811
- Launched: 22 October 1831
- In service: 20 November 1835
- Stricken: 9 May 1863
- Fate: Broken up 1870

General characteristics
- Class & type: Bucentaure-class ship of the line
- Displacement: 3,868 tonneaux
- Tons burthen: 2,034 port tonneaux
- Length: 59.28 m (194 ft 6 in)
- Beam: 15.27 m (50 ft 1 in)
- Draught: 7.8 m (25 ft 7 in)
- Depth of hold: 7.64 m (25 ft 1 in)
- Sail plan: Full-rigged ship
- Crew: 866 (wartime)
- Armament: 90 guns: Lower gun deck: 30 × 36 pdr guns; Upper gun deck: 32 × 24 pdr guns; Forecastle and Quarterdeck: 14 × 12 pdr guns & 14 × 36 pdr carronades

Jupiter was a 3rd rank, 90-gun Bucentaure-class ship of the line built for the French Navy during the 1830s. Completed in 1833, she played a minor role in the Crimean War of 1854–1855.

== Description ==
Designed by Jacques-Noël Sané, the Bucentaure-class ships had a length of 59.28 metres (194 ft 6 in), a beam of 15.27 metres (50 ft 1 in) and a depth of hold of 7.64 metres (25 ft 1 in). The ships displaced 3,868 tonneaux and had a mean draught of 7.8 metres (25 ft 7 in). They had a tonnage of 2,034 port tonneaux. Their crew numbered 866 officers and ratings during wartime. They were fitted with three masts and ship rigged.

The muzzle-loading, smoothbore armament of the Bucentaure class consisted of thirty 36-pounder long guns on the lower gun deck and thirty-two 24-pounder long guns on the upper gun deck. The armament on the quarterdeck and forecastle varied as the ships' authorised armament was changed over the years that the Bucentares were built. Jupiter was fitted with fourteen 12-pounder long guns and fourteen 36-pounder carronades.

== Construction and career ==
Jupiter was laid down on 5 November 1811 at the Arsenal de Cherbourg and named on 25 November. The ship was launched on 22 October 1831 and completed in September 1833. She was commissioned on 20 November 1835. Jupiter ferried Admiral de Markau from Brest to Fort-de-France, Martinique, to replace Admiral Halgan as governor of the French Antilles in 1836. The ship transported troops to French Algeria the following year. She took part in the naval parade of 6 September 1850 in Cherbourg, and in the Crimean War. Jupiter was stricken on 4 May 1863, hulked as a barracks ship at Rochefort and broken up in 1870.

== Bibliography ==
- Roche, Jean-Michel (2005). Dictionnaire des bâtiments de la flotte de guerre française de Colbert à nos jours [Dictionary of French Warships from Colbert to Today]. Vol. 1: 1671-1870. Roche. ISBN 978-2-9525917-0-6. OCLC 165892922.
- Winfield, Rif and Roberts, Stephen S. (2015) French Warships in the Age of Sail 1786-1861: Design, Construction, Careers and Fates. Seaforth Publishing. ISBN 978-1-84832-204-2
