= French ship Tilsitt (1810) =

Ship of the line of the French Navy

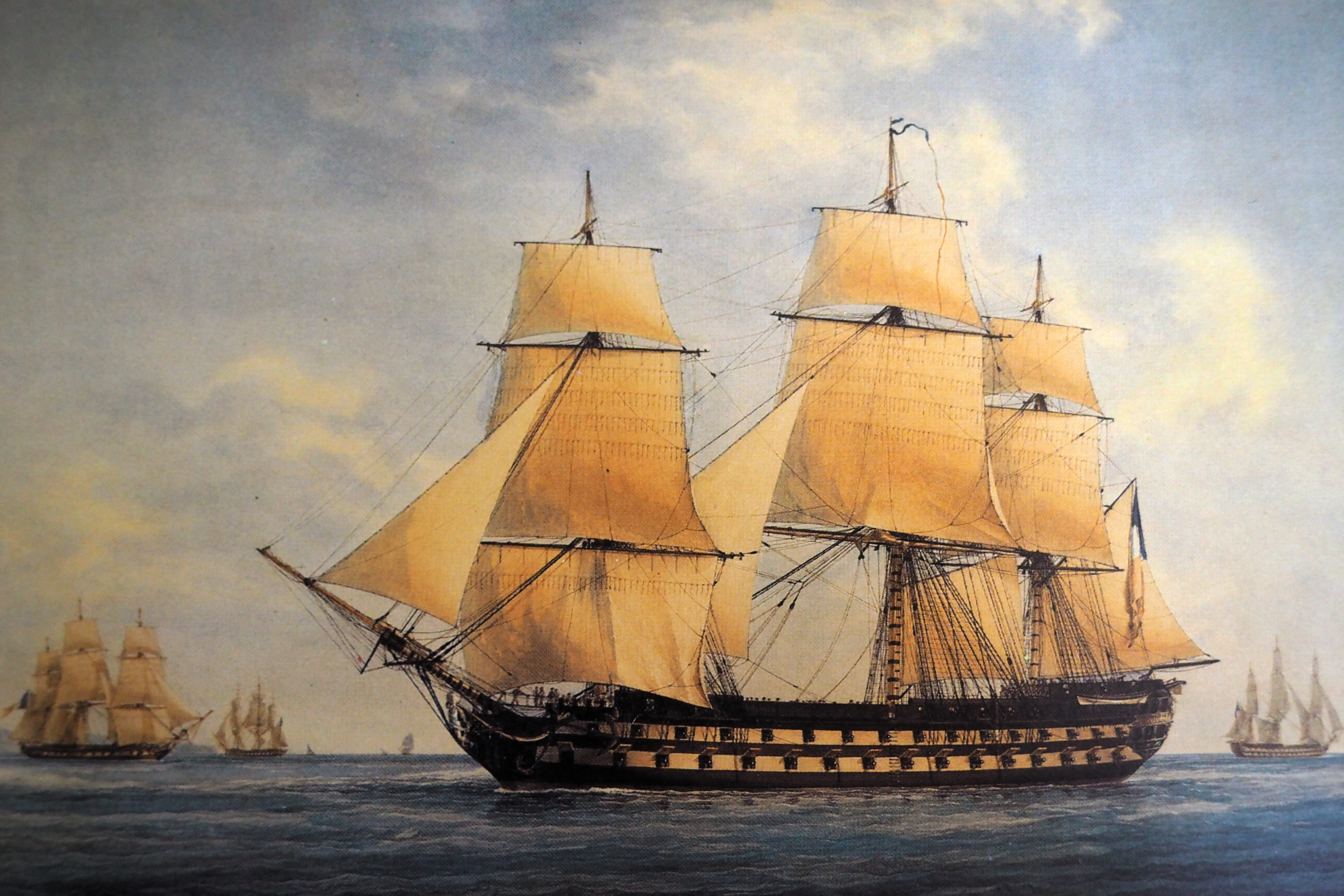
- Robuste, sister ship of Tilsitt

History

France
- Name: Tilsitt
- Namesake: Treaties of Tilsit
- Ordered: June 1807
- Builder: Anvers, Belgium
- Laid down: 1807
- Launched: 15 August 1810
- Stricken: 10 February 1814
- Fate: Broken up in 1818

General characteristics
- Class & type: Bucentaure-class ship of the line
- Displacement: 3,868 tonneaux
- Tons burthen: 2,034 port tonneaux
- Length: 59.28 m (194 ft 6 in)
- Beam: 15.27 m (50 ft 1 in)
- Draught: 7.8 m (25 ft 7 in)
- Depth of hold: 7.64 m (25 ft 1 in)
- Sail plan: Full-rigged ship
- Crew: 866 (wartime)
- Armament: 90 guns: Lower gun deck: 30 × 36 pdr guns; Upper gun deck: 32 × 24 pdr guns; Forecastle and Quarterdeck: 14 × 12 pdr guns & 14 × 36 pdr carronades

Tilsitt was a 3rd rank, 90-gun Bucentaure-class ship of the line built for the French Navy during the first decade of the 19th century. Completed in 1811, she played a minor role in the Napoleonic Wars.

== Description ==
Designed by Jacques-Noël Sané, the Bucentaure-class ships had a length of 59.28 metres (194 ft 6 in), a beam of 15.27 metres (50 ft 1 in) and a depth of hold of 7.64 metres (25 ft 1 in). The ships displaced 3,868 tonneaux and had a mean draught of 7.8 metres (25 ft 7 in). They had a tonnage of 2,034 port tonneaux. Their crew numbered 866 officers and ratings during wartime. They were fitted with three masts and ship rigged.

The muzzle-loading, smoothbore armament of the Bucentaure class consisted of thirty 36-pounder long guns on the lower gun deck and thirty-two 24-pounder long guns on the upper gun deck. The armament on the quarterdeck and forecastle varied as the ships' authorised armament was changed over the years that the Bucentares were built. Tilsitt was fitted with fourteen 12-pounder long guns and fourteen 36-pounder carronades.

== Construction and career ==
Tilsitt was ordered in June 1807 and laid down in Antwerp that same month. The ship was named on 28 July and launched on 15 August 1810. She was commissioned with a Flemish crew on 4 January 1811 and completed in May. Tilsitt was assigned to the Scheldt Squadron in February 1812 and participated in the defense of Antwerp in March 1813. She was given to Holland with the Treaty of Fontainebleau of 1814, and commissioned in the Royal Netherlands Navy as Neptunus.
