= French ship Eylau (1808) =

Ship of the line of the French Navy

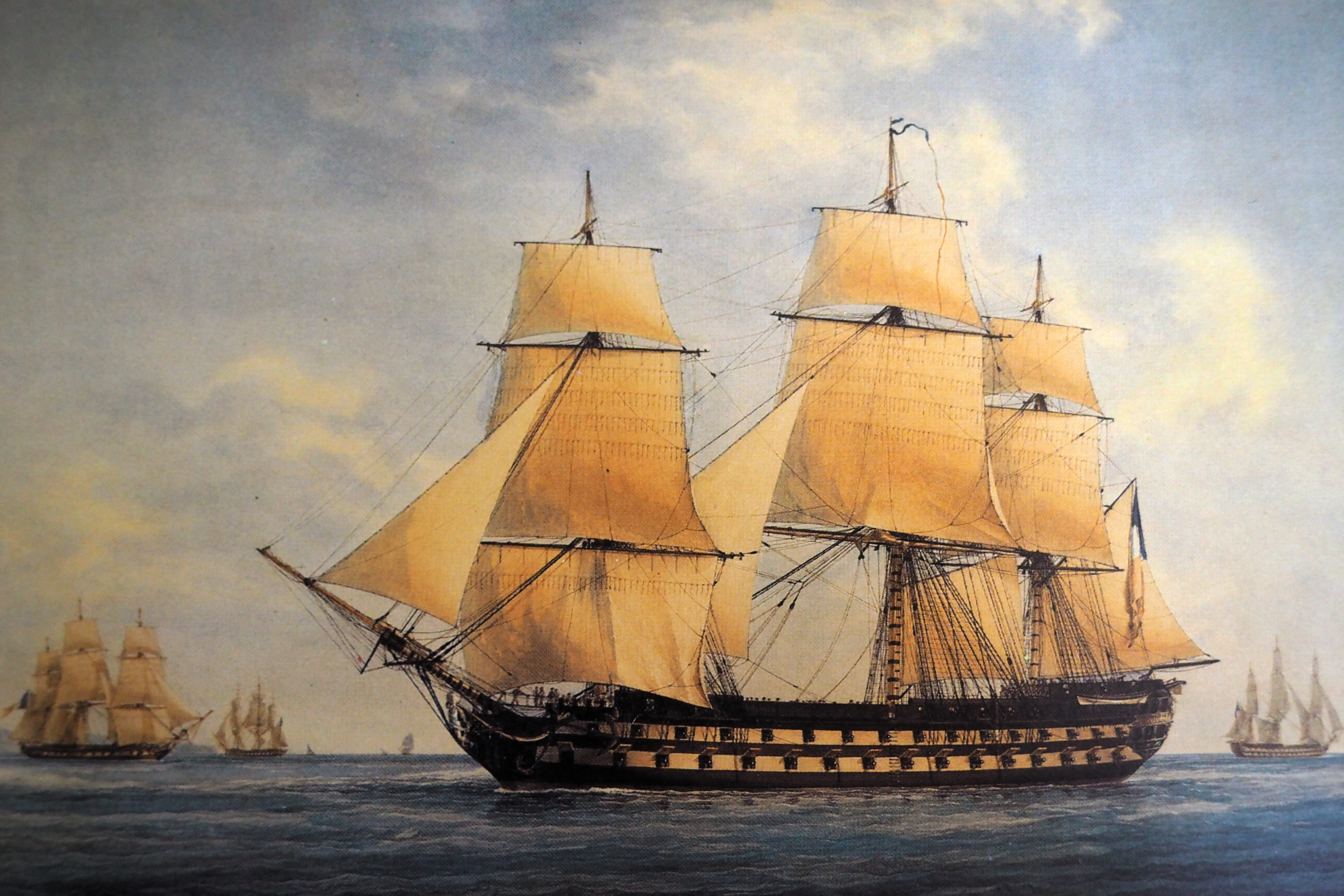
- The Robuste, sister-ship of the Eylau

History

France
- Name: Eylau
- Namesake: Battle of Eylau
- Ordered: 4 June 1804
- Builder: Lorient
- Laid down: 19 December 1805
- Launched: 18 November 1808
- In service: 11 March 1809
- Stricken: 1 June 1829
- Fate: Broken up 1829

General characteristics
- Class & type: Bucentaure-class ship of the line
- Displacement: 3,868 tonneaux
- Tons burthen: 2,034 port tonneaux
- Length: 59.28 m (194 ft 6 in)
- Beam: 15.27 m (50 ft 1 in)
- Draught: 7.8 m (25 ft 7 in)
- Depth of hold: 7.64 m (25 ft 1 in)
- Sail plan: Full-rigged ship
- Crew: 866 (wartime)
- Armament: 80 guns: Lower gun deck: 30 × 36 pdr guns; Upper gun deck: 32 × 24 pdr guns; Forecastle and Quarterdeck: 14 × 12 pdr guns, 10 × 36 pdr carronades and 4 × 36 pdr obusiers

Eylau was a 3rd rank, 80-gun Bucentaure-class ship of the line built for the French Navy during the first decade of the 19th century. Completed in 1809, she played a minor role in the Napoleonic Wars.

== Description ==
Designed by Jacques-Noël Sané, the Bucentaure-class ships had a length of 59.28 metres (194 ft 6 in), a beam of 15.27 metres (50 ft 1 in) and a depth of hold of 7.64 metres (25 ft 1 in). The ships displaced 3,868 tonneaux and had a mean draught of 7.8 metres (25 ft 7 in). They had a tonnage of 2,034 port tonneaux. Their crew numbered 866 officers and ratings during wartime. They were fitted with three masts and ship rigged.

The muzzle-loading, smoothbore armament of the Bucentaure class consisted of thirty 36-pounder long guns on the lower gun deck and thirty-two 24-pounder long guns on the upper gun deck. The armament on the quarterdeck and forecastle varied as the ships' authorised armament was changed over the years that the Bucentares were built. Eylau was fitted with fourteen 12-pounder long guns, ten 36-pounder carronades and four obusiers.

== Construction and career ==
Eylau was ordered on 4 June 1804 and named as Saturne on 26 February 1805. The ship was laid down in September at the Arsenal de Lorient and was renamed Eylau on 2 July 1807 in commemoration of the victory at the Battle of Eylau. She was launched on 19 November 1808, commissioned on 11 March 1809 by Captain Jurien de La Gravière and completed in May. In 1811, she was the flagship of Admiral Allemand. The next year Eylau was transferred to Toulon. After the Bourbon Restoration in 1814, she was stationed in the Caribbean under Captain Larue. The ship was broken up in Brest in 1829.
