= French ship Auguste (1811) =

Ship of the line of the French Navy

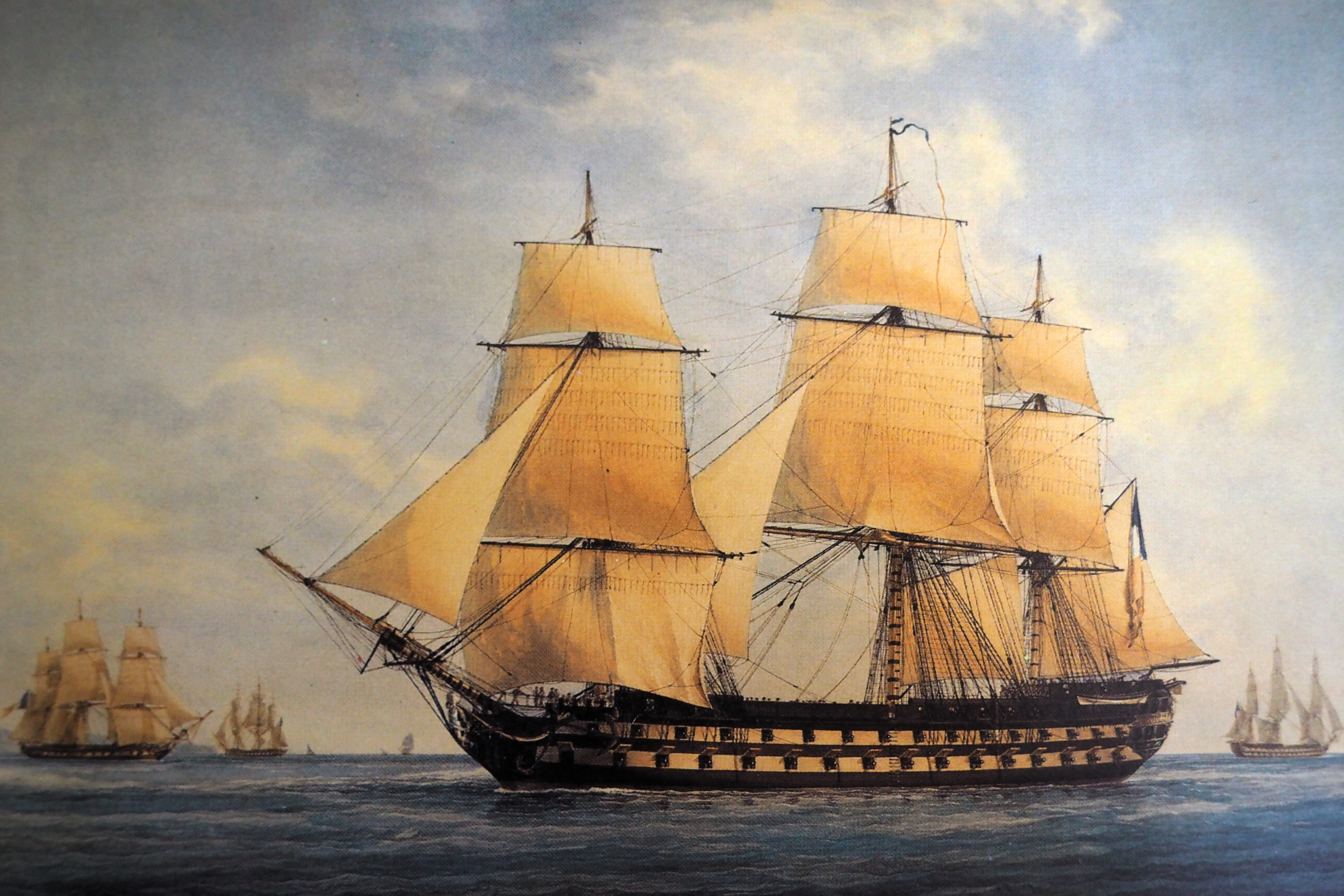
- The Robuste, sister-ship of the Auguste

History

France
- Name: Auguste
- Ordered: 31 August 1807
- Builder: Anvers, Belgium
- Laid down: 1807
- Launched: 25 April 1811
- Stricken: 1827
- Fate: Broken up 1827

General characteristics
- Class & type: Bucentaure-class ship of the line
- Displacement: 3,868 tonneaux
- Tons burthen: 2,034 port tonneaux
- Length: 59.28 m (194 ft 6 in)
- Beam: 15.27 m (50 ft 1 in)
- Draught: 7.8 m (25 ft 7 in)
- Depth of hold: 7.64 m (25 ft 1 in)
- Sail plan: Full-rigged ship
- Crew: 866 (wartime)
- Armament: 90 guns: Lower gun deck: 30 × 36 pdr guns; Upper gun deck: 32 × 24 pdr guns; Forecastle and Quarterdeck: 14 × 12 pdr guns & 14 × 36 pdr carronades

Auguste was a 3rd rank, 90-gun Bucentaure-class ship of the line built for the French Navy during the first decade of the 19th century. Completed in 1811, she played a minor role in the Napoleonic Wars.

== Description ==
Designed by Jacques-Noël Sané, the Bucentaure-class ships had a length of 59.28 metres (194 ft 6 in), a beam of 15.27 metres (50 ft 1 in) and a depth of hold of 7.64 metres (25 ft 1 in). The ships displaced 3,868 tonneaux and had a mean draught of 7.8 metres (25 ft 7 in). They had a tonnage of 2,034 port tonneaux. Their crew numbered 866 officers and ratings during wartime. They were fitted with three masts and ship rigged.

The muzzle-loading, smoothbore armament of the Bucentaure class consisted of thirty 36-pounder long guns on the lower gun deck and thirty-two 24-pounder long guns on the upper gun deck. The armament on the quarterdeck and forecastle varied as the ships' authorised armament was changed over the years that the Bucentares were built. Auguste was fitted with fourteen 12-pounder long guns and fourteen 36-pounder carronades.

== Construction and career ==
Auguste was ordered on 31 August 1807 and laid down in the following month in Antwerp. The ship was named on 17 October and launched on 25 April 1811. She was commissioned the following day and completed in July. August was assigned to the Scheldt Squadron in February 1812 and participated in the defence of Antwerp in March 1814. She was renamed Illustre that same month, following the Bourbon Restoration. The Treaty of Fontainebleau left her to France, and with 11 other ships of the line, she sailed to her new station in Brest in October. The ship was disarmed the next month, and never sailed again. In a state of disrepair, she was broken up in 1827.
