= French ship Conquérant (1812) =

Ship of the line of the French Navy

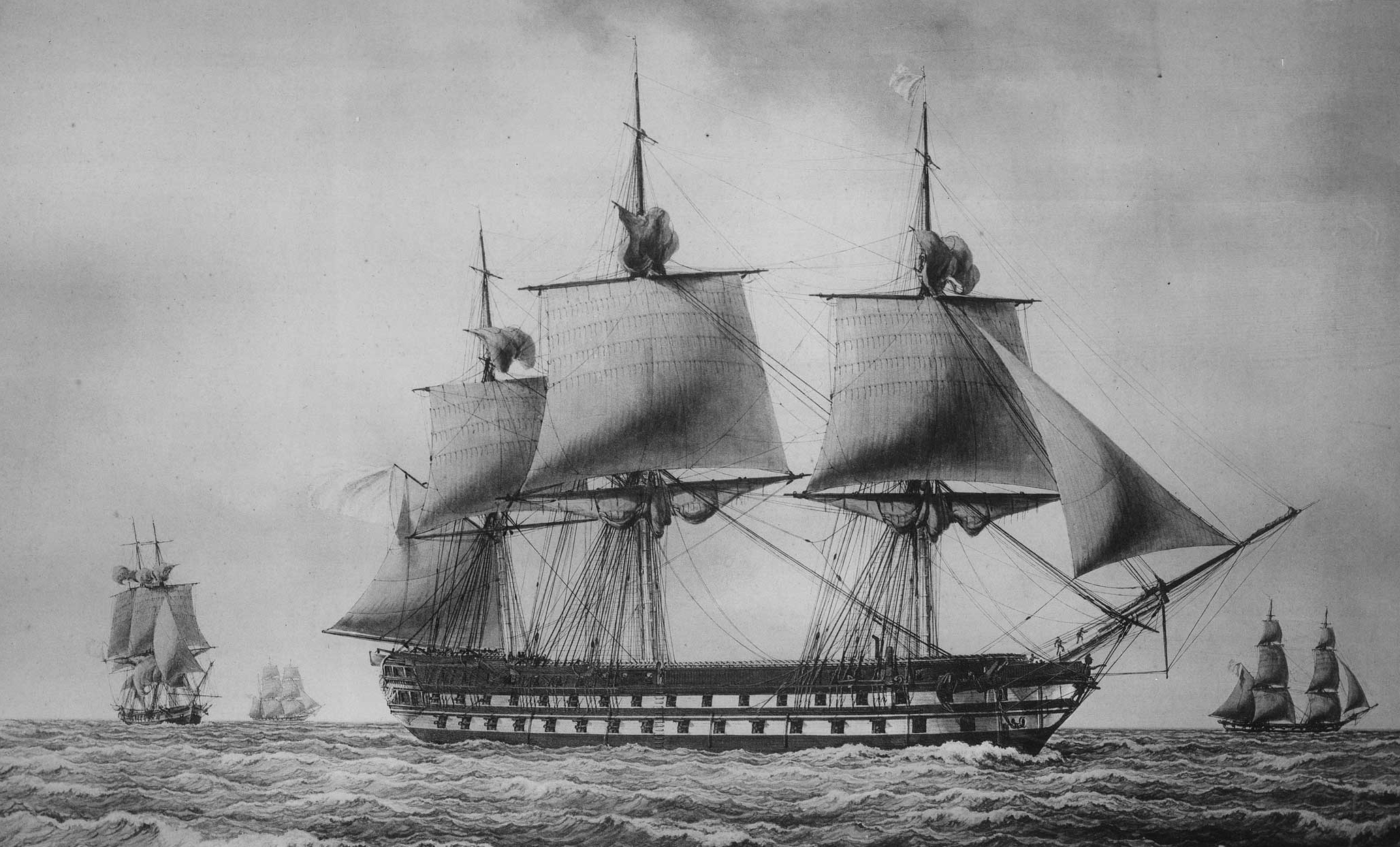
- Painting of Conquérant by François Roux

History

France
- Name: Conquérant
- Namesake: Conqueror
- Ordered: 26 January 1810
- Builder: Anvers, Belgium
- Laid down: 1803
- Launched: 27 April 1812
- In service: 27 April 1812
- Stricken: 1831
- Fate: Broken up 1842

General characteristics
- Class & type: Bucentaure-class ship of the line
- Displacement: 3,868 tonneaux
- Tons burthen: 2,034 port tonneaux
- Length: 59.28 m (194 ft 6 in)
- Beam: 15.27 m (50 ft 1 in)
- Draught: 7.8 m (25 ft 7 in)
- Depth of hold: 7.64 m (25 ft 1 in)
- Sail plan: Full-rigged ship
- Crew: 866 (wartime)
- Armament: 90 guns: Lower gun deck: 30 × 36 pdr guns; Upper gun deck: 32 × 24 pdr guns; Forecastle and Quarterdeck: 14 × 12 pdr guns & 14 × 36 pdr carronades

Conquérant (French pronunciation: [kɔ̃keʁɑ̃]) was a 3rd rank, 90-gun Bucentaure-class ship of the line built for the French Navy during the first decade of the 19th century. Completed in 1812, she played a minor role in the Napoleonic Wars.

== Description ==
Designed by Jacques-Noël Sané, the Bucentaure-class ships had a length of 59.28 metres (194 ft 6 in), a beam of 15.27 metres (50 ft 1 in) and a depth of hold of 7.64 metres (25 ft 1 in). The ships displaced 3,868 tonneaux and had a mean draught of 7.8 metres (25 ft 7 in). They had a tonnage of 2,034 port tonneaux. Their crew numbered 866 officers and ratings during wartime. They were fitted with three masts and ship rigged.

The muzzle-loading, smoothbore armament of the Bucentaure class consisted of thirty 36-pounder long guns on the lower gun deck and thirty-two 24-pounder long guns on the upper gun deck. The armament on the quarterdeck and forecastle varied as the ships' authorised armament was changed over the years that the Bucentares were built. Conquérant was fitted with fourteen 12-pounder long guns and fourteen 36-pounder carronades.

== Construction and career ==
Conquérant was ordered on 26 January 1809 and laid down in December 1808 in Antwerp. The ship was launched on 24 April 1811 and commissioned the following day. She was completed in September and assigned to the Scheldt Squadron. Conquérant was retained by France on 1 August 1814 in accordance with the Treaty of Fontainebleau during the Bourbon Restoration. The ship arrived at Brest on 6 June. She was refitted in 1821, and was sent to Toulon three years later. Conquérant participated in the Morea expedition in 1827 and was damaged by fire at Smyrna, Russia, on 29 October 1829. The ship participated in the Invasion of Algiers in 1830.
