= French ship Illustre =

Seven ships of the French Navy have borne the name Illustre ("Illustrious")

== Ships named Illustre ==
- Illustre (1666), a 64-gun ship of the line.
- Illustre (1713), a galley.
- Illustre (1750), a 64-gun ship of the line, lead ship of her class .
- Illustre (1781), a 74-gun Magnanime-class ship of the line.
- Dantzig (1807), a 74-gun Téméraire-class ship of the line of the Borée sub-type, was originally ordered as Illustre.
- Illustre (1811), an 80-gun Bucentaure-class ship of the line.
- Auguste (1811), an 80-gun Bucentaure-class ship of the line, was renamed Illustre at the Bourbon Restauration.

== See also ==
- HMS Illustrious

== Notes and references ==
=== Bibliography ===
- Roche, Jean-Michel (2005). Dictionnaire des bâtiments de la flotte de guerre française de Colbert à nos jours. Vol. 1. Group Retozel-Maury Millau. p. 250. ISBN 978-2-9525917-0-6. OCLC 165892922.
