= French ship Eylau =

A number of ships of the French Navy have borne the name Eylau, in honour of the Battle of Eylau:

- Eylau (1808), an 80-gun Bucentaure-class ship of the line
- Eylau (1856), a 100-gun Hercule-class ship of the line, converted to steam while still on keel.
