= French ship Illustre (1811) =

Ship of the line of the French Navy

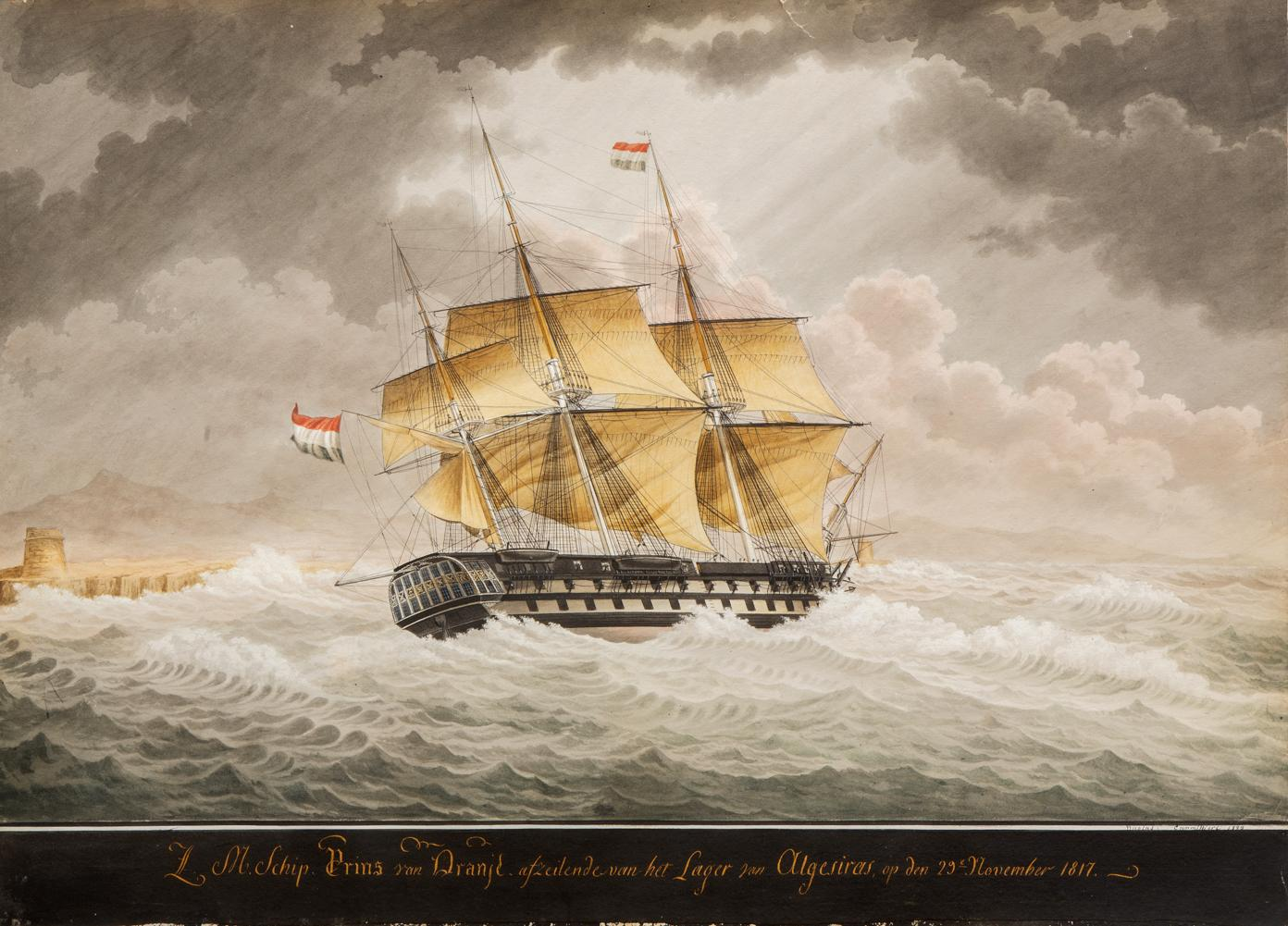
- Zr.Ms. Prins van Oranje, ex Illustre in 1817, by Nicolas Cammillieri of Malta

History

France
- Name: Illustre
- Namesake: Illustrious
- Ordered: July 1807
- Builder: Anvers, Belgium
- Launched: June 1811
- Stricken: 1814
- Fate: Sold for breaking up 1825

General characteristics
- Class & type: Bucentaure-class ship of the line
- Displacement: 3,868 tonneaux
- Tons burthen: 2,034 port tonneaux
- Length: 59.28 m (194 ft 6 in)
- Beam: 15.27 m (50 ft 1 in)
- Draught: 7.8 m (25 ft 7 in)
- Depth of hold: 7.64 m (25 ft 1 in)
- Sail plan: Full-rigged ship
- Crew: 866 (wartime)
- Armament: 90 guns: Lower gun deck: 30 × 36 pdr guns; Upper gun deck: 32 × 24 pdr guns; Forecastle and Quarterdeck: 14 × 12 pdr guns & 14 × 36 pdr carronades

Illustre was a 3rd rank, 90-gun Bucentaure-class ship of the line built for the French Navy during the first decade of the 19th century. Completed in 1811, she played a minor role in the Napoleonic Wars.

== Description ==
Designed by Jacques-Noël Sané, the Bucentaure-class ships had a length of 59.28 metres (194 ft 6 in), a beam of 15.27 metres (50 ft 1 in) and a depth of hold of 7.64 metres (25 ft 1 in). The ships displaced 3,868 tonneaux and had a mean draught of 7.8 metres (25 ft 7 in). They had a tonnage of 2,034 port tonneaux. Their crew numbered 866 officers and ratings during wartime. They were fitted with three masts and ship rigged.

The muzzle-loading, smoothbore armament of the Bucentaure class consisted of thirty 36-pounder long guns on the lower gun deck and thirty-two 24-pounder long guns on the upper gun deck. The armament on the quarterdeck and forecastle varied as the ships' authorised armament was changed over the years that the Bucentares were built. Illustre was fitted with fourteen 12-pounder long guns and fourteen 36-pounder carronades.

== Construction and career ==
Illustre was ordered in July 1807 and named on 27 July. The ship was laid down the following month in Antwerp and launched on 9 June 1811. She was commissioned four days later and completed in October. Illustre was assigned to the Scheldt Squadron in February 1812. The ship was ceded to the Royal Netherlands Navy under the terms the Treaty of Fontainebleau of 1814 and renamed Prins van Oranje. She became a sheer hulk in 1819 and was sold for scrap in 1825.
