= Tonnant-class ship of the line =

Series of eight 80-gun ships

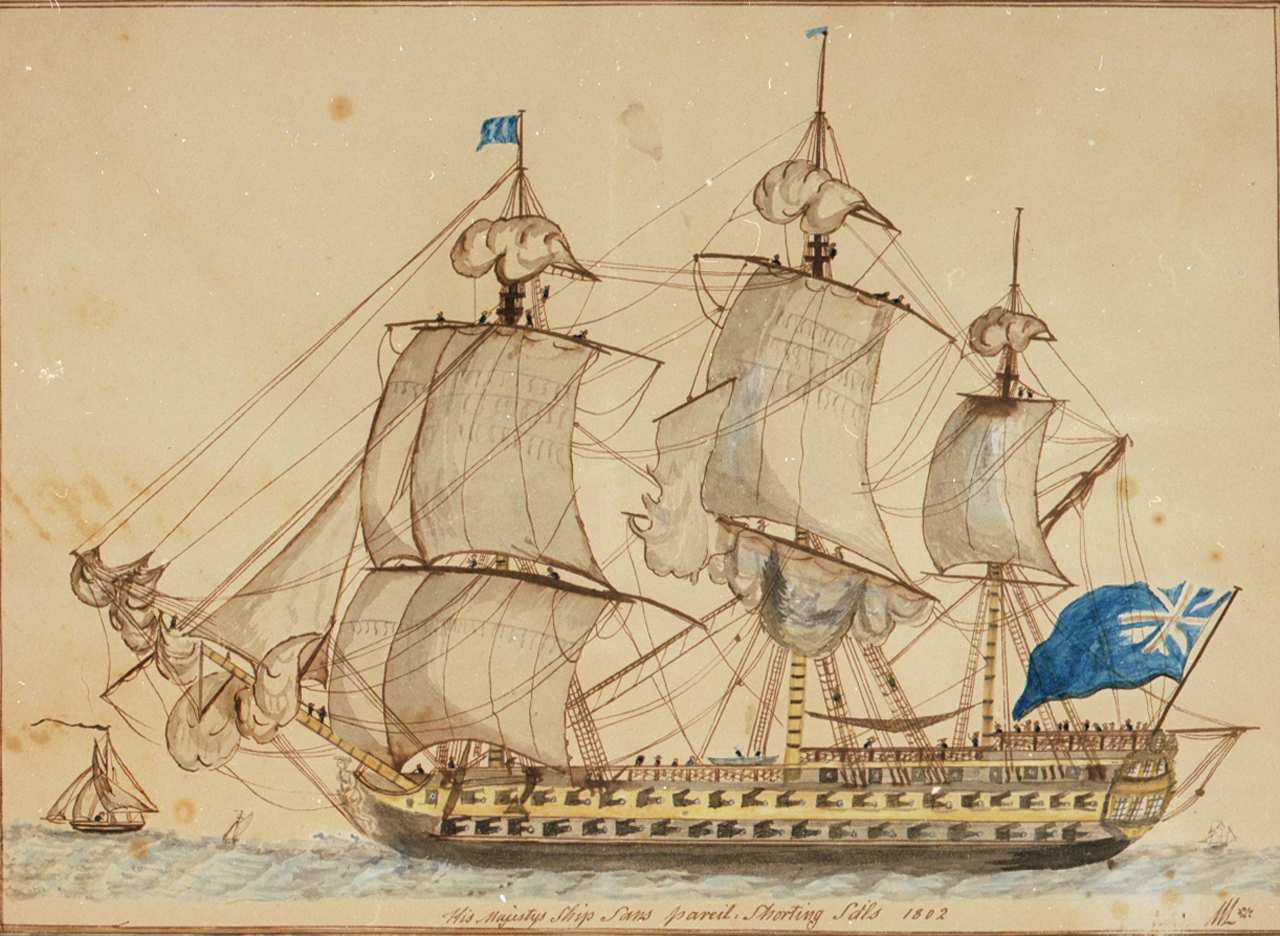
- Sans Pareil as HMS Sans Pareil in 1800

Class overview
- Name: Tonnant
- Builders: Toulon, Brest and Rochefort
- Operators: French Navy; Royal Navy
- Preceded by: Saint-Esprit class
- Succeeded by: Bucentaure class
- In commission: 1790–1834
- Planned: 11
- Completed: 8
- Canceled: 3
- Lost: 7
- Retired: 1

General characteristics
- Type: Ship of the line
- Displacement: 3,868 tonneaux
- Tons burthen: 2,034 port tonneaux
- Length: 59.28 m (194.5 ft)
- Beam: 15.27 m (50.1 ft)
- Draught: 7.80 m (25.6 ft)
- Depth of hold: 7.64 m (25.1 ft)
- Propulsion: Sail
- Complement: 854 in wartime (866 by 1802)
- Armament: 80 guns; 30 36-livres (= 38.875 lbs); 32 24-livres (= 26.92 lbs); 18 12-livres (= 12.96 lbs; 4 36-livre howitzers
- Armour: Timber
- Notes: Ships in class include: Tonnant, Indomptable, Sans Pareil, Indivisible, Foudroyant, Formidable, Guillaume Tell, Franklin.

The Tonnant class was a series of eight 80-gun ships of the line designed in 1787 by Jacques-Noël Sané, whose plans for the prototype were approved on 29 September 1787. With sixteen gunports on the lower deck on each side (although only fifteen of these ports on each side were routinely provided with 36-livre guns) these were the most effective two-deckers of their era. Their broadside of 1,102 livres equated to 1,190 British pounds weight, over 50% more than the standard British 74-gun ship, and even greater than that of a British 100-gun three-decker.

Five ships were ordered from 1787 to 1793, and all were completed during the 1790s; six more were ordered in January 1794 to be built to this design at Toulon, but only three of these were named and built. All but one of the eight ships were to be captured or destroyed by the British Navy, and four of these were to enjoy long careers in their new service. The prizes were highly regarded by British sea officers, but they proved costly and time-consuming to maintain.

From 1802 a new group (the Bucentaure class) of French 80-gun ships was begun of slightly modified design, of which more than 24 were begun.

== Tonnant class (8 ships) ==
The design dimensions of these ships (in French pieds of 324.84mm) were 182.5 overall length, 167 keel length x 47.0 breadth x 23.5 depth in hold (see General Characteristics box for metric equivalents and those in UK/US units).

- Tonnant

Builder: Toulon
Begun: December 1787
Launched: 24 October 1789
Completed: September 1790
Fate: Captured 2 August 1798 in the Battle of the Nile, added to Royal Navy as HMS Tonnant, broken up 1821

- Indomptable

Builder: Brest
Begun: September 1788
Launched: 20 December 1790
Completed: April 1793
Fate: Wrecked off Rota 22 October 1805 after the Battle of Trafalgar

- Sans Pareil

Builder: Brest
Begun: October 1790
Launched: 8 June 1793
Completed: September 1793
Fate: Captured 1 June 1794 by the Royal Navy during Fourth Battle of Ushant, broken up October 1842

- Indivisible

Builder: Brest
Begun: May 1793
Launched: 8 July 1799
Completed: October 1799
Fate: Renamed Alexandre 5 February 1802, captured by Britain 6 February 1805, hulked 1808 and sold to be broken up May 1822

- Foudroyant

Builder: Rochefort
Ordered: December 1793
Launched: 18 May 1799
Completed: August 1800
Fate: Struck 26 October 1833 and broken up 1834

- Formidable

Builder: Toulon
Begun: August 1794
Launched: 17 March 1795
Completed: October 1795
Fate: Captured 3 November 1805 during Battle of Cape Ortegal, renamed HMS Brave, broken up April 1816

- Guillaume Tell

Builder: Toulon
Begun: September 1794
Launched: 21 October 1795
Completed: July 1796
Fate: Captured 31 March 1800 off Malta, renamed HMS Malta, broken up August 1840

- Franklin

Builder: Toulon
Begun: November 1794
Launched: 25 June 1797
Completed: March 1798
Fate: Captured 2 August 1798 in the Battle of the Nile, renamed HMS Canopus, broken up October 1887
