= French ship Donawerth (1808) =

Ship of the line of the French Navy

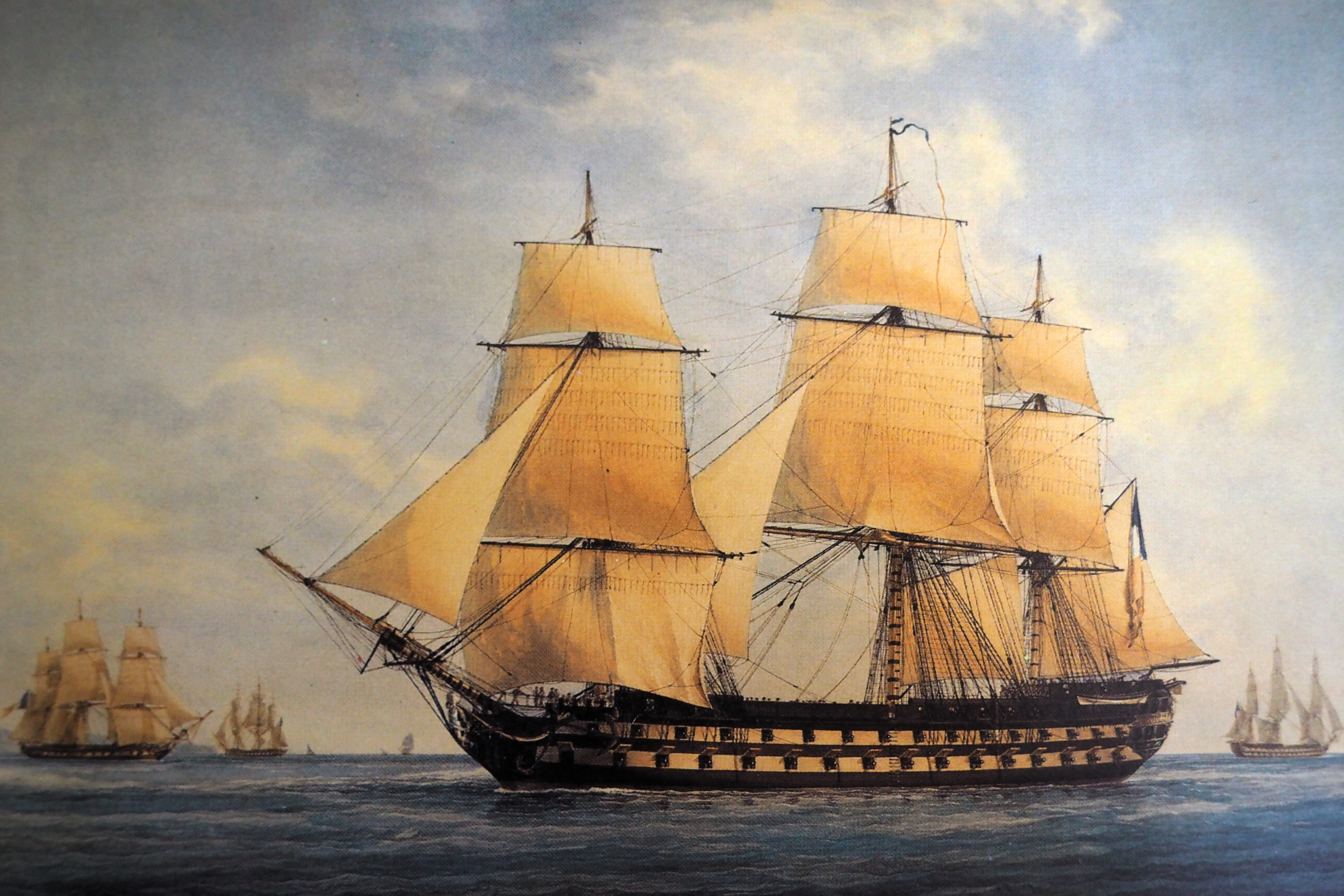
- The Robuste, sister-ship of the Donawerth

History

France
- Name: Donawerth
- Namesake: Battle of Donauwörth
- Ordered: 11 August 1806
- Builder: Toulon
- Laid down: 1806
- Launched: 4 July 1808
- Fate: Broken up 1824

General characteristics
- Class & type: Bucentaure-class ship of the line
- Displacement: 3,868 tonneaux
- Tons burthen: 2,034 port tonneaux
- Length: 59.28 m (194 ft 6 in)
- Beam: 15.27 m (50 ft 1 in)
- Draught: 7.8 m (25 ft 7 in)
- Depth of hold: 7.64 m (25 ft 1 in)
- Sail plan: Full-rigged ship
- Crew: 866 (wartime)
- Armament: 80 guns: Lower gun deck: 30 × 36 pdr guns; Upper gun deck: 32 × 24 pdr guns; Forecastle and Quarterdeck: 10 × 12 pdr guns & 16 × 36 pdr carronades

The Donawerth was a 3rd rank, 80-gun Bucentaure-class ship of the line built for the French Navy during the first decade of the 19th century. Completed in 1808, she played a minor role in the Napoleonic Wars. The ship was condemned in 1823 and subsequently scrapped.

== Description ==
Designed by Jacques-Noël Sané, the Bucentaure-class ships had a length of 59.28 metres (194 ft 6 in), a beam of 15.27 metres (50 ft 1 in) and a depth of hold of 7.64 metres (25 ft 1 in). The ships displaced 3,868 tonneaux and had a mean draught of 7.8 metres (25 ft 7 in). They had a tonnage of 2,034 port tonneaux. Their crew numbered 866 officers and ratings during wartime. They were fitted with three masts and ship rigged.

The muzzle-loading, smoothbore armament of the Bucentaure class consisted of thirty 36-pounder long guns on the lower gun deck and thirty-two 24-pounder long guns on the upper gun deck. The armament on the quarterdeck and forecastle varied as the ships' authorised armament was changed over the years that the Bucentares were built. Donauwerth was fitted with ten 12-pounder long guns and sixteen 36-pounder carronades.

== Construction and career ==
Donawerth, named to commemorate the victory at the Battle of Donauwörth, was ordered on 11 August 1806. The ship was laid down on 15 December at the Arsenal de Toulon and launched on 4 July 1808. She was commissioned on 1 October and completed later that month. The ship was judged too expensive to repair and condemned in August 1823. The demolition of Donawerth was completed in January 1824.
