= French ship Donawerth =

Three ships of the French Navy have borne the name Donawerth, in honour of the battle of Donauwörth during the Ulm Campaign :

- Donawerth (1808), an 80-gun Tonnant-class ship of the line
- Donawerth (1854), an 80-gun ship of the line
- Jean Bart (1852), an 80-gun ship of the line renamed Donawerth in 1868
