= French ship Diadème =

Two ships of the French Navy have borne the name Diadème, after the diadem, a type of crown.

- Diadème (1756), a 74-gun Diadème-class ship of the line, launched 1756. Renamed Brutus 1792. Razeed to a 42-gun frigate 1794. Broken up 1797.
- Diadème (1811), an 86-gun Bucentaure-class ship of the line. Launched 1811. Hulked 1856.

== See also ==
- HMS Diadem
