= French ship Tilsitt =

Two ships of the French Navy have borne the name Tilsitt in honour of the Treaties of Tilsit:

== Ships named Tilsitt ==
- Tilsitt (1810), 80-gun ship of the line.
- Tilsitt (1854), a 90-gun ship of the line.

== Notes and references ==
=== Bibliography ===
- Roche, Jean-Michel (2005). Dictionnaire des bâtiments de la flotte de guerre française de Colbert à nos jours. Vol. 1. Group Retozel-Maury Millau. pp. 372–373. ISBN 978-2-9525917-0-6. OCLC 165892922.
- Roche, Jean-Michel (2005). Dictionnaire des bâtiments de la flotte de guerre française de Colbert à nos jours. Vol. 2. Group Retozel-Maury Millau. p. 250. ISBN 978-2-9525917-0-6. OCLC 165892922.
