= Bucentaure-class ship of the line =

1804 class of French Navy ships of the line

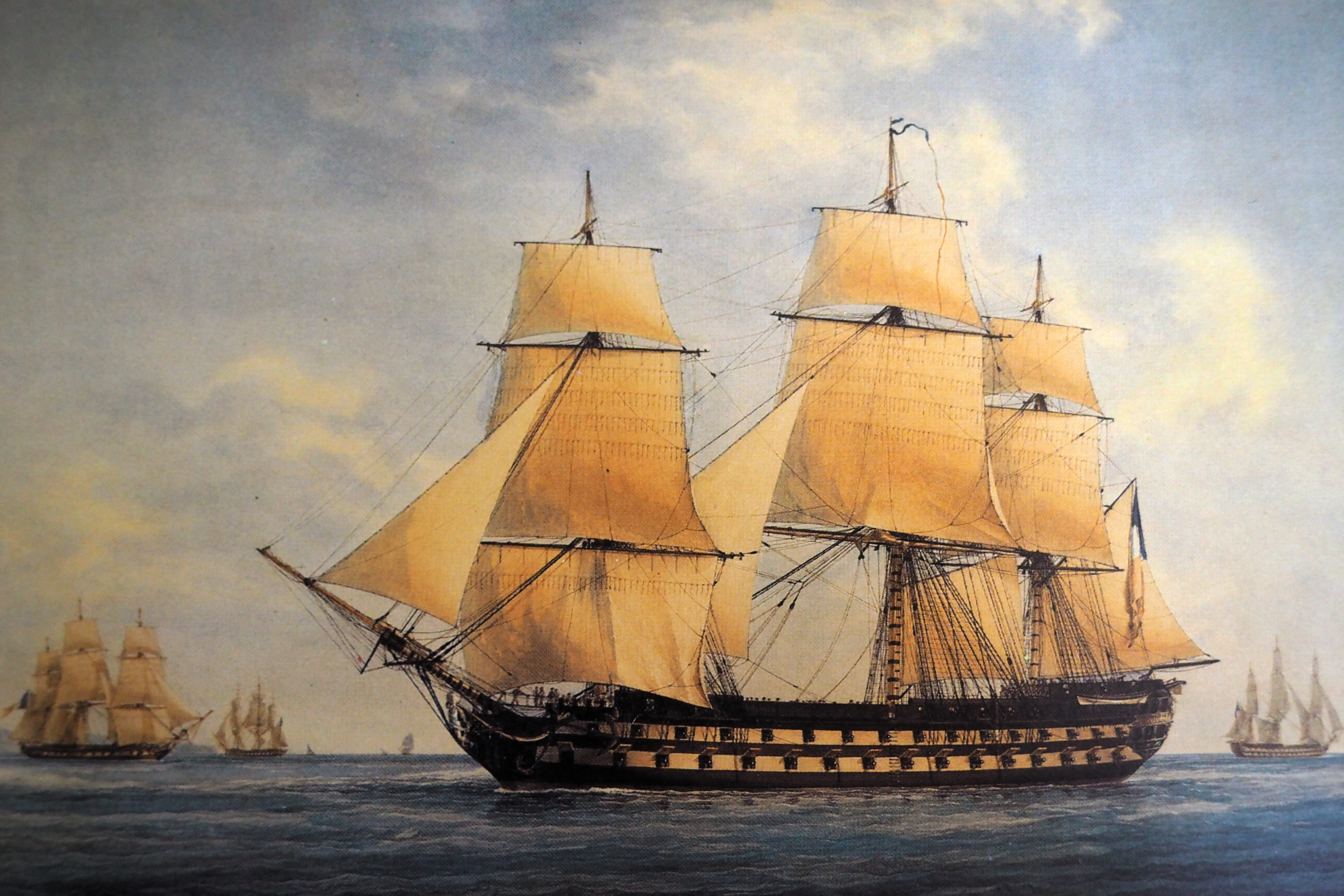
- The Robuste

Class overview
- Name: Bucentaure
- Builders: Toulon, Lorient, Rochefort, Antwerp, Cherbourg
- Operators: French Navy; Two Sicilies Navy
- Preceded by: Tonnant class
- Succeeded by: Suffren class
- In service: 1804–1863
- Completed: 21
- Canceled: 8+
- Lost: 4

General characteristics
- Type: Ship of the line
- Displacement: 3,868 tonneaux
- Tons burthen: 2,034 port tonneaux
- Length: 59.3 m (194 ft 7 in) (gundeck); 53.92 m (176 ft 11 in) (keel)
- Beam: 15.3 m (50 ft 2 in)
- Depth of hold: 7.8 m (25 ft 7 in)
- Propulsion: Sail
- Sail plan: 2,683 m^{2} (28,880 sq ft)
- Complement: 866
- Armament: 80 guns (original); 30 × 36-livres; 32 × 24-livres; 18 × 12-livres; 6 × 36-livre howitzers

The Bucentaure class was a class of 80-gun French ships of the line built to a design by Jacques-Noël Sané from 1802 onwards, of which at least 29 were ordered but only 21 ships were launched. They were a development from his earlier Tonnant class.

== Armament ==
As built, the first two ships of this class carried the same 80-gun armament as their predecessors of the Tonnant class - thirty 36-livre guns on the lower deck, thirty-two 24-livre guns on the upper deck, and eighteen 12-livre guns plus six 36-livre obusiers (howitzers) on the spar deck above (the French livre was about 8% greater than the British pound weight, so that 12 livres almost equaled 13 British pounds, and the 36-livre round equated to 38lbs 13.6oz).

Under the 1806 règlement, the spar deck ordnance was altered to fourteen 12-livre guns plus ten 36-livre carronades. Subsequently, additional 36-livre carronades were carried by most later ships of the class, raising them to 86-gun ships (with variations in actual numbers).

== Ships in class ==
- Bucentaure

Builder: Toulon
Ordered: 16 September 1802
Begun: 22 November 1802
Launched: 13 July 1803
Completed: January 1804
Fate: Captured by the Royal Navy on 21 October 1805 following Trafalgar. Was briefly recaptured but was then wrecked on 23 October 1805.

- Neptune (i)

Builder: Toulon
Ordered: 16 September 1802
Begun: 4 January 1803
Launched: 15 August 1803
Completed: April 1804
Fate: Captured by the Spanish Navy in June 1808, renamed Neptuno, Broken up 1820.

- Robuste

Builder: Toulon
Ordered: 26 March 1805
Begun: May 1805
Launched: 30 October 1806
Completed: May 1807
Fate: Scuttled and burnt on 26 October 1809.

- Ville de Varsovie

Builder: Rochefort
Ordered: 30 April 1804
Begun: 22 March 1805 as Tonnant, renamed 14 May 1807
Launched: 10 May 1808
Completed: July 1808
Fate: Captured and burnt by the British in April 1809.

- Donawerth

Builder: Toulon
Ordered: 11 August 1806
Begun: December 1806
Launched: 4 July 1808
Completed: October 1808
Fate: Broken up 1824.

- Eylau

Builder: Lorient
Begun: September 1805
Launched: 19 November 1808
Completed: May 1809
Fate: Condemned 1829 and broken up.

- Friedland

Builder: Antwerp
Begun: July 1807
Launched: 2 May 1810
Completed: May 1811
Fate: Handed over to the Netherlands on 1 August 1814 and renamed Vlaming. Broken up 1823.

- Sceptre

Builder: Toulon
Ordered: 126 December 1808
Begun: March 1809
Launched: 15 August 1810
Completed: March 1811
Fate: Condemned 1828 and hulked.

- Tilsitt

Builder: Antwerp
Begun: September 1807
Launched: 15 August 1810
Completed: May 1811
Fate: Handed over to the Netherlands on 1 August 1814 and renamed Neptunus. Condemned and broken up 1818.

- Auguste

Builder: Antwerp
Begun: October 1807
Launched: 25 April 1811
Completed: July 1811
Fate: Handed over to the Netherlands on 1 August 1814 but returned to France in September and renamed Illustre. Condemned and broken up 1827.

- Pacificateur

Builder: Antwerp
Begun: September 1807
Launched: 22 May 1811
Completed: August 1811
Fate: Condemned 1823.

- Illustre

Builder: Antwerp
Begun: August 1807
Launched: 9 June 1811
Completed: October 1811
Fate: Handed over to the Netherlands on 1 August 1814 and renamed Prins van Oranje. Sold 1825 and broken up.

- Diademe

Builder: Lorient
Begun: November 1807
Launched: 1 December 1811
Completed: March 1812
Fate: Condemned 1856 and broken up 1868.

- Conquérant

Builder: Antwerp
Begun: December 1808
Launched: 27 April 1812
Completed: September 1812
Fate: Condemned 1831.

- Zélandais

Builder: Cherbourg
Begun: October 1810
Launched: 12 October 1813
Completed: March 1814
Fate: Condemned 1836 and hulked. Broken up 1858.

- Magnifique

Builder: Lorient
Begun: December 1809
Launched: 29 October 1814
Completed: November 1814
Fate: Condemned 1837.

- Centaure

Builder: Cherbourg
Begun: November 1811
Launched: 8 January 1818
Completed: April 1818
Fate: Renamed Santi Pietri in October 1823. Hulked 1849, burnt by accident 1862.

- Neptune (ii)

Builder: Lorient
Begun: December 1810
Launched: 21 March 1818
Completed: June 1818
Fate: Hulked 1858, broken up 1868.

- Algésiras

Builder: Lorient
Begun: April 1812
Launched: 21 August 1823
Completed: April 1824
Fate: Hulked 1846.

- Jupiter

Builder: Cherbourg
Begun: November 1811
Launched: 22 October 1831
Completed: September 1833
Fate: hulked 1863.

- Vesuvio

Builder: Castellammare di Stabia
Begun: August 1812
Launched: 2 December 1824
Completed: 1825
Fate: Not launched as French warship; became Neapolitan ship in December 1813.

No other vessels of this design were completed, the following were begun at Antwerp, but were taken over in 1814 by the Netherlands, were never launched or completed, and were broken up on the stocks.

- Mars

Begun: April 1811

- Alexandre

Begun: June 1811

- Tibre

Begun: June 1811

- Atlas

Begun: September 1811

- Fougueux

Begun: July 1812

A further ship to this same design was begun as Saturno in May 1812 at Venice, and was renamed Emo by the Austrians following their seizure of that city, but was broken up on the stocks in 1818–19. A second ship was ordered at Venice in 1813, but was never laid down. Finally a further ship of this class was ordered in 1812 at Rochefort, but was never laid down or even assigned a name.
