= Powder monkey =

Young boys serving on Age of Sail warships

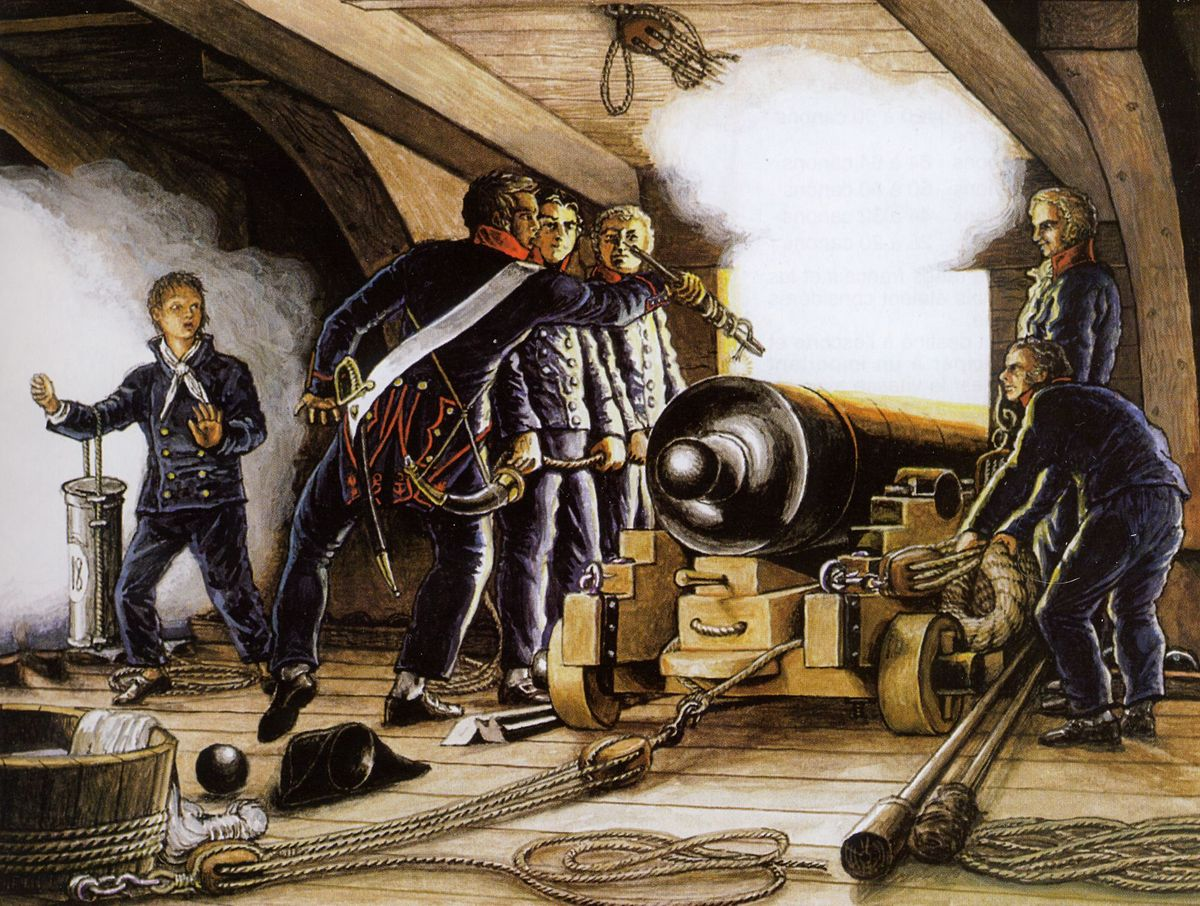
Powder monkey (left) on a French Imperial Navy ship of the line

A powder monkey on a Union Navy vessel during the American Civil War, circa. 1864

A powder boy or powder monkey manned naval artillery guns as a member of a ship's crew, primarily during the Age of Sail. Their chief role was to ferry gunpowder from the powder magazine in the ship's hold to the artillery pieces, either in bulk or as cartridges, to minimize the risk of fires and explosions. The function was usually fulfilled by boy seamen of 12 to 14 years of age, selected for the job for their speed and height: they were short and could move more easily in the limited space between decks and would also be hidden behind the ship's gunwale, keeping them from being shot by enemy ships' sharpshooters. Powder monkeys held no official naval rank on the ship. Some women and older men also worked as powder monkeys.

Many of the powder monkeys in the Royal Navy were of the poor working class. The Marine Society encouraged youths to join the Royal Navy by providing clothes, bedding, and a rudimentary education. In the mid-1790s, it is estimated that the Marine Society was sending 500-600 boys per year to the fleet, although not all of these boys became powder monkeys. Of the boys who were recruited by the Marine Society, most had no other option than to join the navy, as their parents could not afford to raise them. However, a significant number had familial ties to the sea. This group had cousins, fathers, and even grandfathers who were sailors, thus making them want to continue family traditions and exploit their sense of adventure.

The United States did not have an established navy until after its independence in 1776, and even then, it was loosely organized. The United States Navy started using powder monkeys in the late 18th century, modeling its structure upon the Royal Navy. The two navies fought against each other in the War of 1812, during which both sides utilized the special physical gifts that powder monkeys offered on board their warships. After the War of 1812, boys under age 12 were forbidden by the U.S. Navy from serving on ships. However, boys above that age were still used as powder monkeys until the Spanish–American War at the end of the 19th century.

The Royal Navy first began using the term "powder monkey" in the 17th century. The term was later used, and continues to be used in some countries, to signify a skilled technician or engineer who engages in blasting work, such as in the mining or demolition industries. In such industries, a "powder monkey" is also sometimes referred to as a "blaster".
