= French ship Robuste (1806) =

Ship of the line of the French Navy

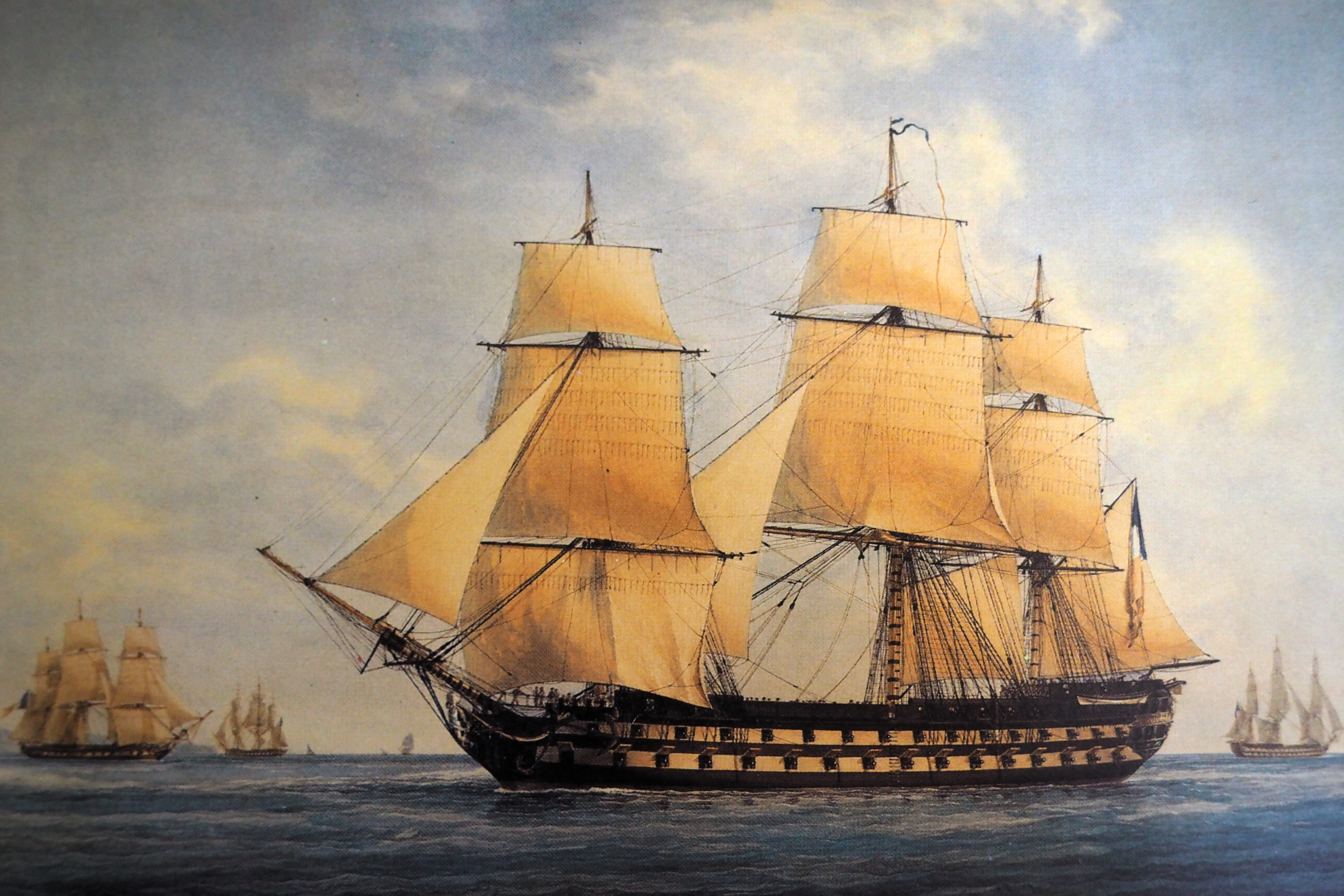
- Portrait of Robuste, by Antoine Roux.

History

France
- Name: Robuste
- Namesake: "Robust"
- Ordered: 26 March 1805
- Builder: Toulon
- Laid down: April 1805
- Launched: 30 October 1806
- Fate: Scuttled on 26 October 1809

General characteristics
- Class & type: Bucentaure-class ship of the line
- Length: 55.88 m (183 ft 4 in) (overall); 53.92 m (176 ft 11 in) (keel)
- Beam: 15.27 m (50 ft 1 in)
- Depth of hold: 7.63 m (25 ft 0 in)
- Propulsion: Sail
- Sail plan: 2,683 m^{2} (28,880 sq ft)
- Complement: 866
- Armament: 80 guns; 30 × 36-pounders; 32 × 24-pounders; 18 × 12-pounders (12 aft, 6 forecastle); 6 × 36-pounder howitzers

Robuste was a Bucentaure-class 80-gun ship of the line of the French Navy, designed by Jacques-Noël Sané.

She was commissioned under Captain Louis-Antoine-Cyprien Infernet, and was later captained by Julien Cosmao and Antoine Marie François Montalan.

From April 1809, she was the flagship of a squadron.

In late 1809, Vice-Admiral Honoré Joseph Antoine Ganteaume was organising shipment of reinforcements to Barcelona. Robuste became the flagship of a squadron under Julien Cosmao, along with Donawerth, Génois, Borée and Lion, as well as the frigates Pauline and Pénélope, and a dozen of transports. The fleet departed Toulon on 24 April 1809, and returned on 1 May without incident.

In October, the squadron attempted another ferry, under Rear-Admiral François Baudin. On 21 October the French were detected by HMS Pomone, which reported to Lord Collingwood's squadron. Collingwood sent his three frigates as a vanguard and sailed with 15 ships of the line to intercept the French. On the morning of 23 October HMS Volontaire detected and reported the French squadron's position.

The British gave chase, but lost contact. HMS Tigre detected Robuste, Borée, Lion and Pauline at dawn on 24 October, but the fleets lost contact again. Contact was re-established in the morning of 25 October, the French sailing close to the shore, and the chase resumed. In the ensuing Battle of Maguelone, Robuste and Lion ran aground around noon near Frontignan. After two hours of fruitless attempts to save the ships, Baudin ordered them scuttled, and they were set on fire in the evening. They exploded at 10h30.
