= 36-pounder long gun =

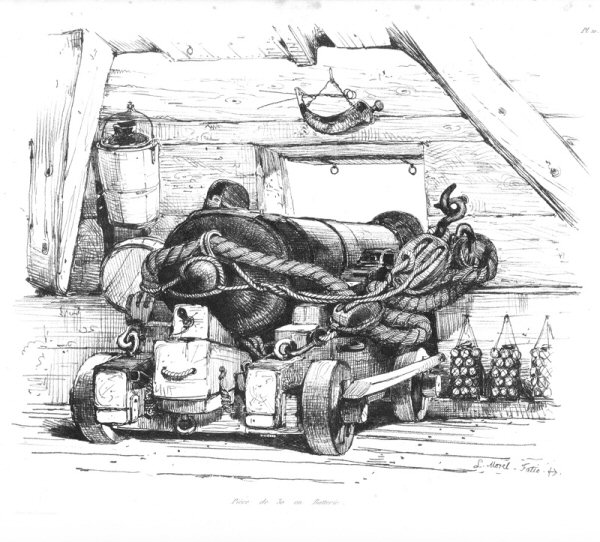
- 36-pounder at the ready. Engraving by Morel-Fatio.
- Type: Naval gun
- Place of origin: France

Service history
- Used by: France

Production history
- Unit cost: 1,760 Francs

Specifications
- Mass: 3250 kg 628 kg (mount)
- Barrel length: 2.865 metres
- Crew: 14 men (1 gun chief, 12 gunners, 1 powder boy)
- Shell weight: 17.6 kg
- Calibre: 174.8 mm
- Muzzle velocity: 450 m/s
- Effective firing range: Maximum: 3700 metres Practical: 1600 metres

The 36-pounder long gun was the largest piece of artillery mounted on French warships of the Age of Sail. They were also used for coastal defense and fortification. They largely exceeded the heaviest guns fielded by the Army, which were 24-pounder long guns. The nominal weight of shot was 36 French livres, 17.6 kg (38.8 lb).

== Usage ==
Installed on the lower deck of the larger warships, the 36-pounder long gun was the largest caliber used in the Navy of the Age of the Sail. Attempts to use 48-pounders were made, for instance on Royal Louis, but these proved impractical to use on ships, partly because their weight allowed for only a few pieces, and because the heavy balls were unwieldy to load by hand. However, some coastal batteries fielded 48-pounders and even 64-pounders.

In the Royal Navy, a similar role was fulfilled by 32-pounder long guns.

== History ==
French warships began to carry 36-pounders under Louis XIV, with the reform of the Navy undertaken by Richelieu. At this time, only first rank warships could carry them. In 1676, the entire Navy fielded merely 64 such heavy pieces, all bronze. From 1690, in only two years, their number increased from 115 to 442 (of which 407 were made of bronze), as the number and size of first-rank ships increased. Many 12-pounders were melted to procure the bronze needed to produce the needed 36-pounders. A maximum was reached in 1702 with 860 guns (411 bronze and 449 iron).

Under Louis XV, their number was significantly reduced (164 in 1718, 452 in 1741), but from the mid-18th century, a sustained rearmament effort increased the number of 36-pounders to 986 in 1756, 1046 in 1777 and 2484 in 1786. These guns were all made of iron.

They armed the lower battery of the largest warships: a 74-gun ship of the line would carry 28; an 80-gun, 30; and both 110-gun and 120-gun, 32.

After the Napoleonic Wars, the 36-pounder long gun remained in use on older warships, though it was largely superseded by the 30-pounder long gun on newer units. The 36-pounders of the 1820s were fitted with flintlock primers, and those produced in this era featured a characteristic ring on the pommel.

== Operation ==
A 36-pounder required a 14-man crew, comprising one chief gunner, 12 gunners, and one powder boy.

To load the piece, the first left-hand gunner would introduce a cartridge into the barrel; the first right-hand gunner would ram it to the bottom of the barrel; the first left-hand gunner would introduce the shot and a cloth wad, which would be rammed by the right-hand gunner. Then the crew would bring the gun to bear by pulling ropes. The chief gunner would then pin the cartridge through the touch hole and pour priming powder.

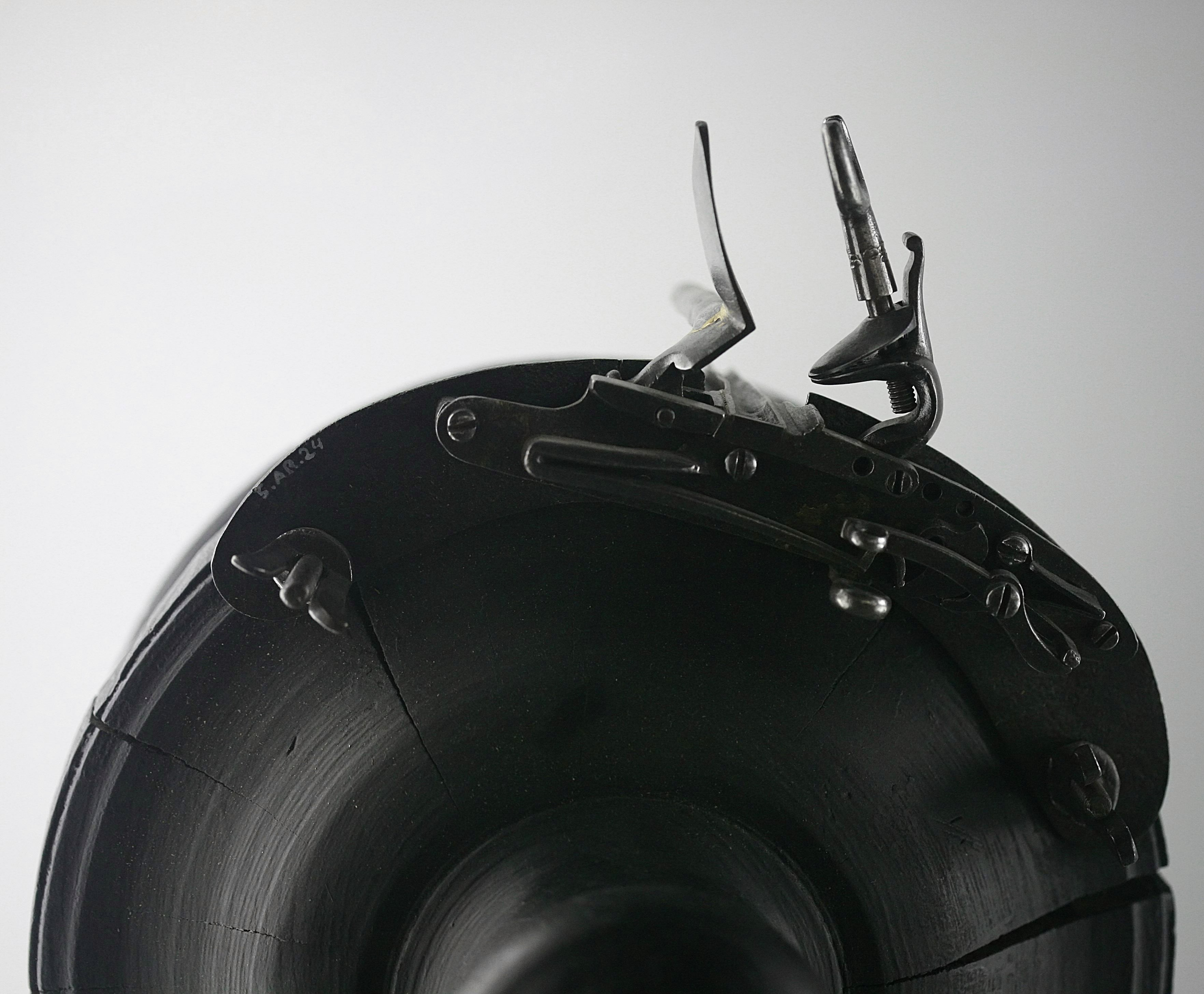
Flintlock firing system of a French naval gun.

The chief gunner would then point the gun with the help of the third and fourth gunners on each side, and the last gunner on the left would then fire the gun by touching the touch hole with a linstock. Flintlock firing was not standardized in the French navy before the end of the First Empire.

The first right-hand gunner would then ram thrice to remove residues from the bore of the gun.

== Sources and references ==
- (in French) Jean Boudriot et Hubert Berti, L'Artillerie de mer : marine française 1650-1850, Paris, éditions Ancre, 1992 (ISBN 2-903179-12-3) (notice BNF no FRBNF355550752).
- (in French) Jean Peter, L'artillerie et les fonderies de la marine sous Louis XIV, Paris, Economica, 1995, 213 p. (ISBN 2-7178-2885-0).
