= Jacques-Noël Sané =

French shipwright (1740–1831)

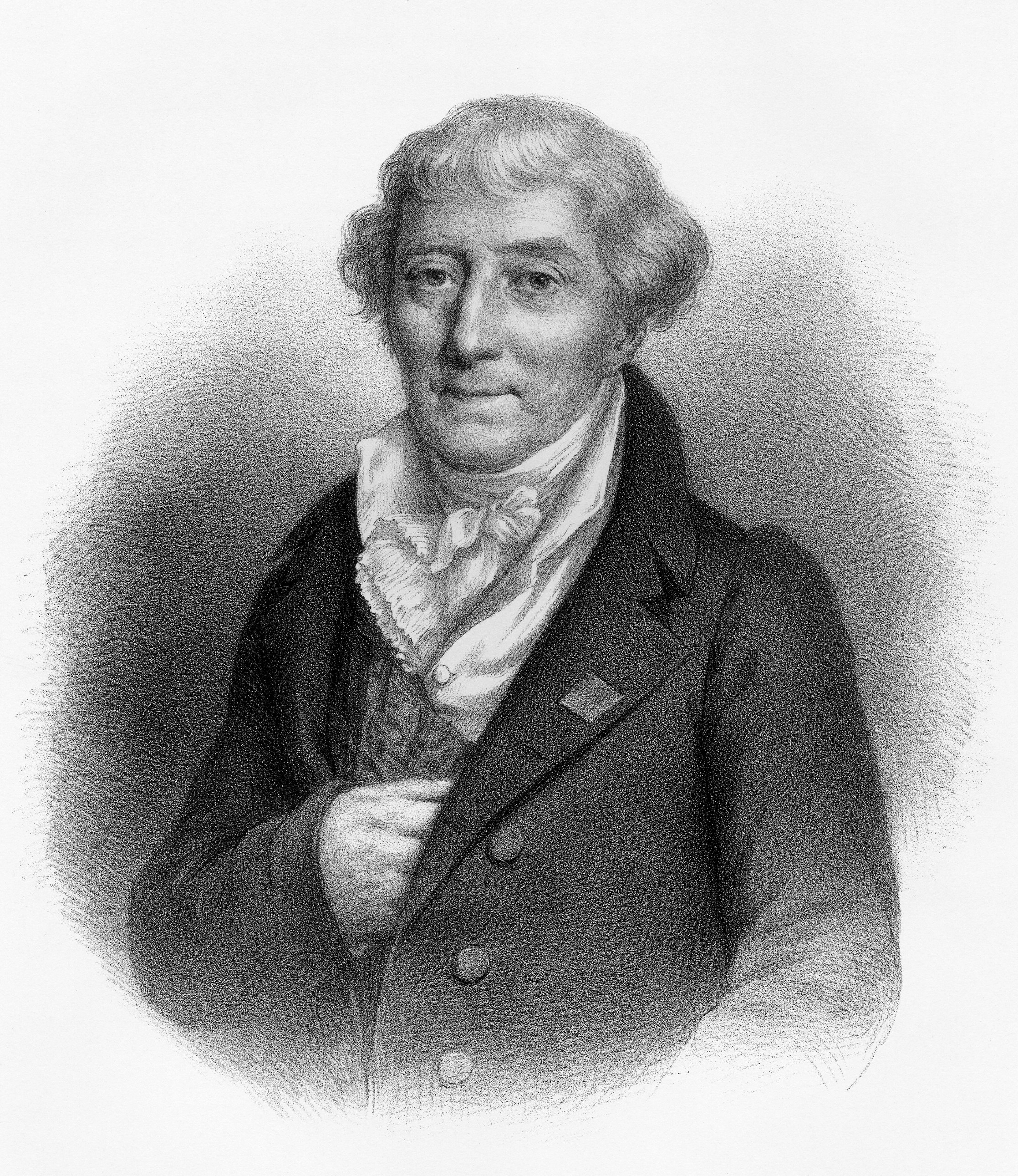
- Portrait by Julien Léopold Boilly, c. 1800
- Born: 18 February 1740; Brest, France
- Died: 22 August 1831 (aged 91); Paris, France
- Education: École des ingénieurs constructeurs de vaisseaux royaux de Paris
- Occupation: Shipwright
- Notable work: Téméraire class; Océan class; Tonnant class
- Children: Amélie Fanny Gabrielle (1784–1812)
- Awards: Baron of Empire; Order of Saint Michael

Jacques-Noël Sané (French pronunciation: [ʒak nɔɛl sane]; 18 February 1740 – 22 August 1831) was a French shipwright. He was the creator of standardised designs for ships of the line and frigates fielded by the French Navy in the 1780s, which served during the French Revolutionary Wars and the Napoleonic Wars and in some cases remained in service into the 1860s. Several ships designed by him were captured by the Royal Navy, which commissioned and even copied several of them. His achievements led Sané to be nicknamed the "naval Vauban." (Note: French: "Vauban de la Marine", after Vauban, who was known for his breakthrough fortifications.)

== Biography ==
Born in Brest in a family of sailors, Sané became a student engineer in 1758 and joined the naval construction academy in Paris in 1765, graduating on 1 October 1766 as an assistant engineer. In 1767, he worked under Ollivier the Elder on naval ships, and with Antoine Choquet de Lindu on merchant ships. In 1769, he embarked on the fluyt Seine, bound for Martinique with four scows and a dredger of his design.

Promoted to engineer in 1774, he designed the Annibal-class 74-gun, comprising Annibal and Northumberland. He then worked on several 12-pounder frigates. During the War of American Independence, Navy minister Sartine, his successor Castries, and engineer Borda requested plans to standardise the production of 18-pounder frigates (equivalent to the British fifth-rate), 74-gun ships of the line (equivalent to the British third-rate), 80-gun two-deckers (without equivalent: similar to a third-rate, but longer than a second-rate and with comparable firepower), and 118-gun three-deckers (equivalent to the British first-rate). Sané won three successive competitions:

- in 1782, his Téméraire class was selected for the 74-guns
- in 1785, his Océan class was selected for the 118-guns
- in 1787, his Tonnant class was later selected for the 80-guns

In 1784, Sané had his only child, Amélie Fanny Gabrielle; she would later marry Captain Delarue de la Gréardière, and die in December 1812.

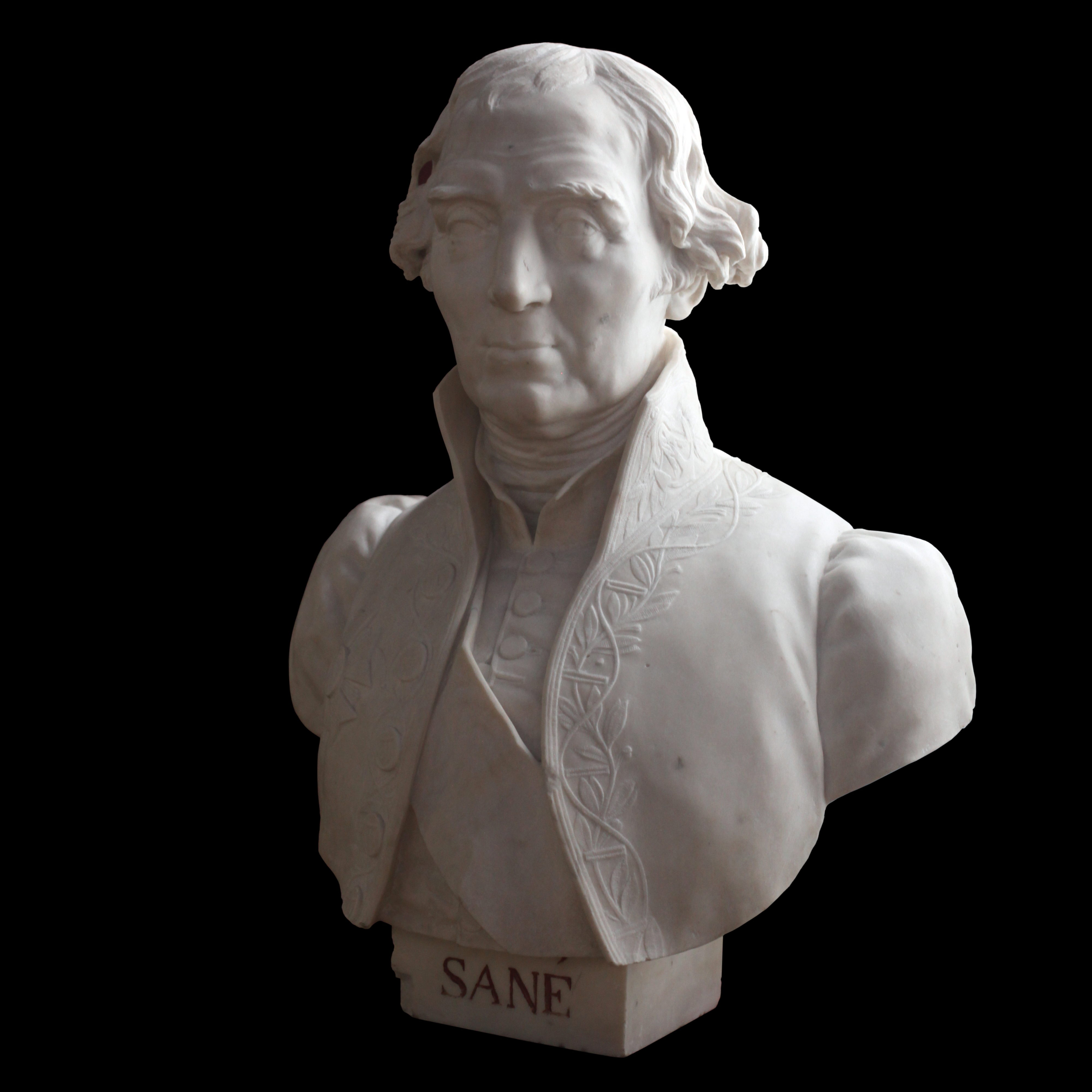
Bust by Louis-Joseph Daumas, on display at the Musée national de la Marine in Paris.

On 18 June 1787, Sané joined the Académie de Marine. In April 1779, he arrived in Saint-Malo for the construction of the Hébé-class Vénus, a 12-pounder 38-gun frigate. He furthermore drew the plans of the frigates Aigle, Cléopâtre, Thisbé and Dryade. In 1789, he was promoted to sub-director of naval constructions.

In 1793, as director of Brest Harbour, he decided to raze the older ships Brutus, Pluton and Argonaute. He was made a member of the French Academy of Sciences in 1796, and naval construction inspector on 7 July 1798, responsible for the coast of the Atlantic and of the English Channel; his duty comprised inspection of the harbours and selection of timbers from the forests in the Pyrenees.

In 1800, Sané was made General inspector for naval engineering, an office he would retain until 1817. In 1807, Sané designed a type of corvette that remained in service until the end of the sailing navy. The same year, Napoléon required a collection of accurate ship models to document the French Navy; Denis Decrès tasked Sané with the project, known as the Trianon model collection, for which 13 models were specially created and 6 others collected and upgraded.

His plans for 18-pounder frigates were adopted in 1810; the same year, he was made a Baron of Empire.

Under the Restoration, Sané was awarded the Order of Saint Michael. In 1820, aged 80, he was made president of the Commission de Paris, although he never involved himself in the upcoming steamship revolution. The first steamer of the French Navy, Sphinx, entered service in 1829.

Sané died in Paris on 22 August 1831, aged 91.

== Work ==
Sané was responsible for

- 9 118-gun ships of the line of the Océan class
- 5 110-gun ships of the Commerce de Paris class
- 27 80-guns of the Tonnant and Bucentaure classes
- 107 74-guns of the Annibal and Téméraire classes, between 1783 and as late as 1841
- 65 18-pounder frigates of the Hébé, Virginie, Hortense and Pallas classes, built between 1781 and 1814.

== Legacy ==
Three ships of the French Navy have been named Sané after Jacques-Noël Sané. The class of 2004 of the École nationale supérieure de techniques avancées Bretagne was named in his honour.

== Sources and references ==
=== Sources ===
- Jaquin, Frédéric (2002). Huit marins brestois, de l'Académie de marine à l'ordre de la libération. Editions Verhest.
- Gibouin, Eugène (1984), "Un éminent ingénieur du Génie maritime, Jacques-Noël Sané 1740-1831", Études d'histoire maritime, Comité des travaux historiques et scientifiques, 107e-108e congrès national des sociétés savantes
- Debusscher, Guy (2005), "Jacques-Noël Sané - 1740-1831 : inspecteur général de Génie maritime", Neptunia, 238
- Henwood, Philippe (1987), "L'Académie de marine à Brest au 18ème siècle", La mer au siècle des encyclopédies, colloque international, Brest, 17-20 septembre 1984, Littérature des voyages, Paris and Geneva: Champion-Slatkine
- Vichot, Jacques (1967), "L'Académie de marine à Brest au 18ème siècle", Répertoire des navires de guerre français, Littérature des voyages, Paris: Association des amis du Musée de la marine
