= 24-pounder long gun =

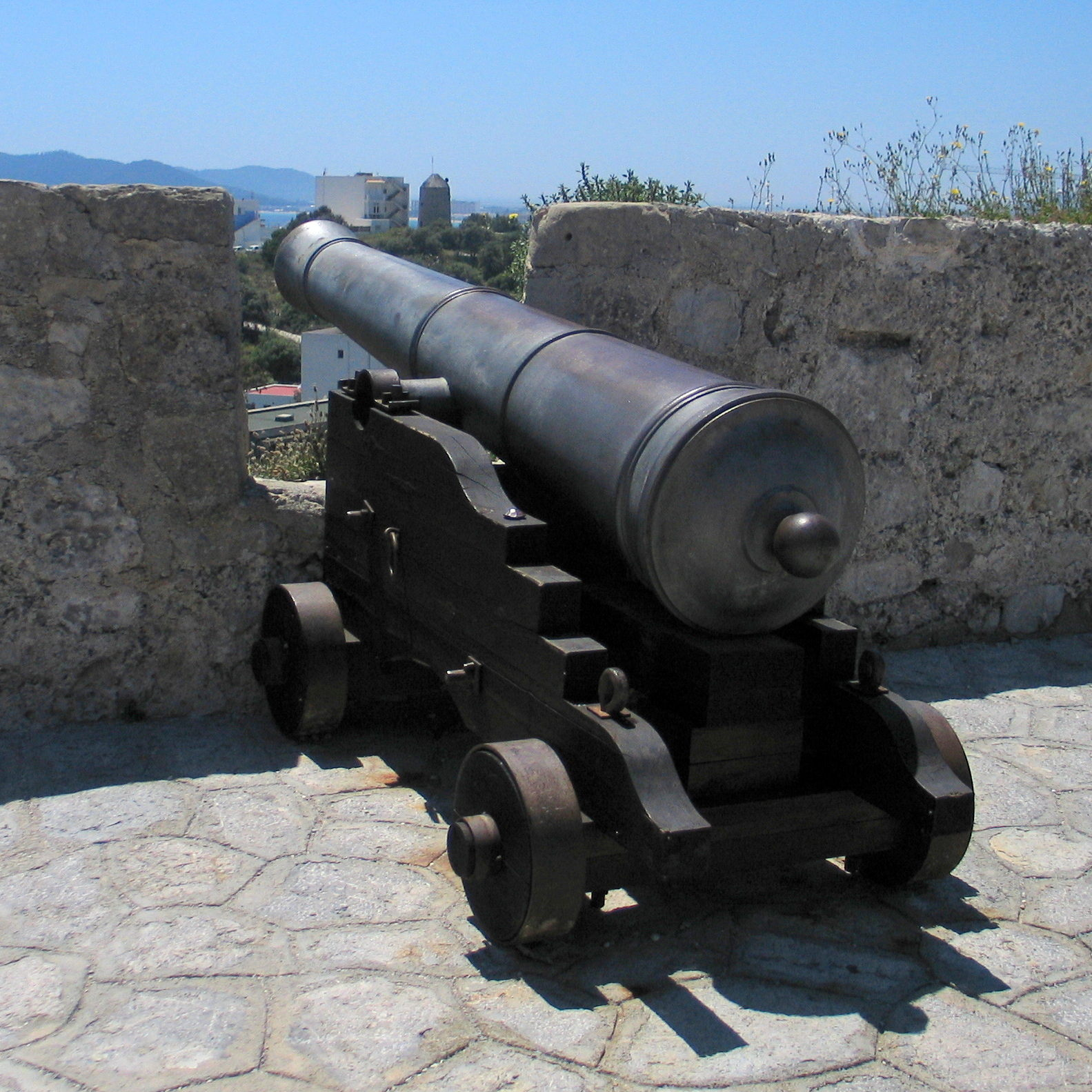
- Spanish 24-pounder long gun mounted on the coastal defences of Ibiza Town.
- Type: Naval gun
- Place of origin: France

Service history
- Used by: France; Spain; Great Britain; Netherlands; Sweden; United States; Qing Dynasty; Two Sicilies; Kingdom of Italy

Production history
- Unit cost: 1252 Francs

Specifications
- Mass: 2,500 kg 470 kg (mount)
- Barrel length: Approx. 3 metres
- Crew: 12 gunners and one powder-boy
- Shell weight: 11.7 kg
- Calibre: 152.2 mm

The 24-pounder long gun was a heavy calibre piece of artillery mounted on warships of the Age of Sail. 24-pounders were in service in the navies of France, Spain, Great Britain, the Netherlands, Sweden, and the United States. They were comparable to the Canon de 24 Gribeauval used by the French Army as its largest piece of siege artillery. 24-pounders were used as main guns on the heaviest frigates of the early 19th century and on fourth-rate ships of the line, on the second deck of first-rate ships of the line, and on the second deck of a few large third-rates.

== Usage ==
The 24-pounder calibre (about 6 inches) was consistent with both the French and the British calibre systems, and was a widespread gun amongst nations between the 17th and the 19th century.

From the late 18th century, the French Navy used the 24-pounder in two capacities: as main gun on frigates and 64-guns, or as secondary artillery on three-deckers and even enlarged versions two-deckers. Under Louis XV, a typical heavy frigate would carry 12-pounder long guns until 1772, when the two vessels of the Pourvoyeuse class were built to carry 24-pounders; these proved too heavy in practical use, however, and the vessels were re-equipped with 18-pounders, heralding the coming of the 18-pounder frigate that would become the standard in many navies of the late 18th century. The experiment was tried again in 1785 with Pomone, a successful design that opened the way to a standardisation on the 24-pounder frigate exemplified by the Romaine class. Overall, 14 of these heavy frigates were built between Pomone in 1785, and Poursuivante in 1798, each carrying between 24 and 30 24-pounders. After the Bourbon Restoration, frigates were built using a different artillery system, carrying 30-pounders.

Two-deckers used the 24-pounder in two capacities: on the smallest two-deckers of 64 guns, the 24-pounder constituted the main artillery, with 26 pieces. Typical 74-gun vessels carried a 36-pounder main battery and an 18-pounder secondary battery, until the enlarged variant of the Téméraire class appeared in 1803, comprising Vétéran and Cassard. More significantly, the 24-pounder armed the secondary battery of all 80-gun ships of the line from 1749, when the Soleil-Royal introduced the practice, resulting in a two-decker with enough firepower to challenge a three-decker of the time.

During the reign of Louis XIV, three-deckers were standardised on a 36-pounder main artillery and an 18-pounder secondary battery. From the mid-18th century, under Louis XV, the secondary battery was strengthened to 24-pounders, beginning with the Sans-Pareil design that yielded Royal Louis. The other capital ships of the era, Ville de Paris, flagship of François Joseph Paul de Grasse during the American War of Independence, and Bretagne, flagship at the Battle of Ushant, similarly carried 24-pounders as secondary batteries. The practices was continued with the Océan class and the Commerce de Paris class. During the First French Empire, 24-pounders would also arm Type 1 Model Towers for coastal defence.

In the Royal Navy, the 24-pounder was similarly used on some heavy frigates, which carried 26 guns. Fourth-rate ships carried 22 on their secondary batteries, and third-rates carried 32. First-rates carried thirty-four 24-pounders on their middle deck.

== British iron 24-pounders ==
Four lengths of iron 24-pounders are mentioned in a notebook from the 1720s: 10 ft (3.0 m), 9 1/2 ft (2.9 m), 9 ft (2.7 m), and 8 1/2 ft (2.6 m) long. Ten surviving guns which are likely examples of the 9 1/2-foot version weigh between 48 and 49 3/4 hundredweight. These guns are very similar to the gun of 9 1/2 feet and 49 1/4 hundredweight which was detailed in the mensuration of 1743.

In the establishment of 1764, two new iron 24-pounders were specified (1 source specifies both guns were 9 1/2 feet long, but this is likely an error):

| Length (ft) | Weight (cwt) |
|---|---|
| 9 1/2 | 49 |
| 9 | 47 1/2 |

One other 24-pounder is mentioned in sources from 1780 and later, specifically a gun of 10 feet and 52 hundredweight. It is unknown whether the gun was new or the same as the 10 foot 24-pounder mentioned above.

=== Blomefield's 24-pounders ===
Sir Thomas Blomefield developed several iron 24-pounders as part of his system of gun construction from the 1790s onward:

| Gun length (ft) | Weight (cwt) | Date first cast | Method of construction |
|---|---|---|---|
| 9 1/2 | 50 1/2 | 1790s | newly cast |
| 9 | 47 3/4 | 1790s | newly cast |
| 8 | 43 | 1813 | newly cast |
| 7 1/2 | 40 | 1813 | newly cast |
| 6 1/2 | 33 | 1805 | newly cast |
| 6 | 30 | 1800 | newly cast |
| 8 | 37 | before 1847 | bored-up from Blomefield 18-pounder 38 cwt |
| 6 | 22 | before 1865 | bored-up from Blomefield 12-pounder 24 cwt |
| 6 | 20 | before 1865 | bored-up from Blomefield 12-pounder 21 cwt |

Except the guns of 50 1/2, 47 3/4, 22, and 20 hundredweight, most of these guns were little used, and declared obsolete in 1865 by the War Department. The guns cast in 1813 were designed to be evaluated against William Congreve's new pattern of gun. The guns of 9 1/2 feet 50 1/2 hundredweight and 9 feet 47 3/4 hundredweight were highly regarded as siege guns and widely used in that role in addition to their naval use. The guns of 22 and 20 hundredweight were mostly used in casemates and flank defenses as replacements for 24-pounder carronades.

=== Congreve's 24-pounders ===
In response to a desire for lighter 24-pounders that could still be double-shotted,William Congreve designed a radical new type of 24-pounder, which was shorter, lighter, and with more metal concentrated around the gun breech rather than the chase (gun barrel). It had a muzzle similar to a carronade, and the breeching ring was discarded in favor of a hole in the center of the neck of the cascabel. Because the weight of the cannon was much farther back, the trunnions could also be cast much farther rearward than in a similar conventional cannon. Initially two guns were manufactured for testing:

| Length (ft) | Weight (cwt) |
|---|---|
| 7 1/2 | 41 |
| 7 1/2 | 37 |

The heavier gun was tested in HMS Eurotas in October 1813, and the lighter gun was tested on HMS Pactolus in February 1814. The results were so favorable (despite somewhat violent recoil) that 300 more guns were ordered, and by 1820, Congreve noted 700 guns as being cast. Congreve also suggested several other guns to be constructed according to his principle, including a 24-pounder of 8 feet and 50 hundredweight. However, the recoil of the guns when in service proved to be worse than the trials indicated, and they were withdrawn from service by 1830, except in East India Company service. That year, 800 24-pounders were bored-up to produce 32-pounders, and they remained in active service in that role past 1865. Congreve's other suggested guns were never used beyond the testing stage.

=== Later 24-pounder designs ===
In 1853, the Aide-Mémoire mentioned 2 designs by Millar:

| Length (ft) | Weight (cwt) |
|---|---|
| 7 1/2 | 41 |
| 6 1/2 | 33 |

These were similar to the Blomefield designs, but with a slightly smaller caliber of 5.792 instead of 5.823 inches.

In addition, a number of guns designated "N.P." for New Pattern appear in the records of the Committee on Ordnance. These have lengths of 9 1/2, 9, 8, 7 1/2 ft (2.3 m), 6 1/2 ft (2.0 m), and 6 ft (1.8 m), but no other details are mentioned. Finally, a 24-pounder of either 4 ft 10 in (1.47 m) or 5 ft (1.5 m) and 18 cwt was mentioned, and it was declared obsolete in 1865 by the War Department.

Images are available showing 24-pounder long guns as the main gun deck armament on the USS Independence as used during the American Revolution; and the USS Constitution and USS Constellation as two of the original six frigates of the United States Navy starting in 1797.

From the War of 1812 until the 1840s, The U.S. Navy used three classifications: the gun proper, which had a barrel weight of 150 lb (68 kg) per pound of shot, the double-fortified gun which had a barrel weight of 200 lb (91 kg) per pound of shot, and the medium gun, which had a barrel weight of 100 lb (45 kg) per pound of shot. By comparison, a carronade would have a barrel weight of 65 lb (29 kg) per pound of shot.
