= Battle of the Basque Roads order of battle =

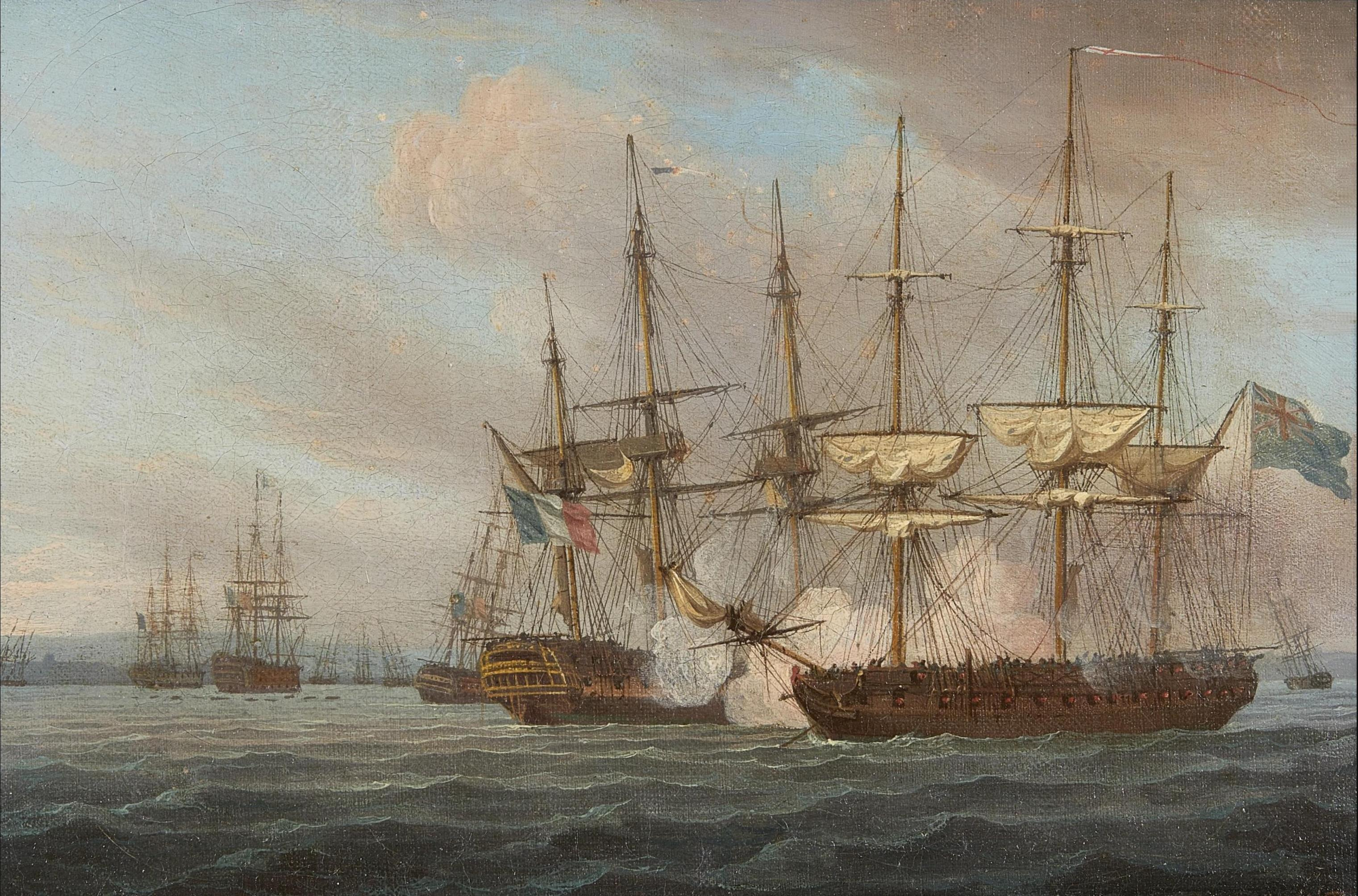
Destruction of the French Fleet in Basque Roads Thomas Sutherland, after Thomas Whitcombe, 1817. NMM

The Battle of the Basque Roads was a major naval battle of the Napoleonic Wars, fought in the narrow Basque Roads at the mouth of the Charente River on the Biscay coast of France. The battle, which lasted from 11 to 25 April 1809, was unusual in that it pitted a hastily assembled squadron of small and unorthodox British Royal Navy warships, distantly supported by a larger fleet, against the main strength of the French Atlantic Fleet, the circumstances dictated by the cramped, shallow coastal waters in which the battle was fought. The battle is also notorious for its political aftermath in both Britain and France.

In February 1809 the French Atlantic Fleet, based at Brest was ordered to sail to the Caribbean to disrupt a British attack on Martinique. The fleet sailed on 22 February but was unable to escape British pursuit and four days later anchored in the sheltered position of Basque Roads (or Aix Roads), under the batteries of the fortified Île-d'Aix. A detachment from the British Channel Fleet, commanded by Admiral Lord Gambier, had followed the French to the harbour and there enacted a close blockade. While Gambier debated what action to take, command of the French fleet was awarded to Contre-amiral Zacharie Allemand, who strengthened the fleet's defences and awaited a British attack. In Britain, First Lord of the Admiralty Lord Mulgrave, called on one of the nation's most popular, maverick young naval officers, Captain Lord Cochrane, to prepare an inshore squadron to attack the French.

Cochrane fitted out 24 fireships and explosion vessels and on the night of 11 April led them into the Roads, accompanied by a squadron of small vessels. The fireships caused panic among the French crews, who cut their anchor cables and drifted onto the rocks and shoals of the anchorage. When morning came, Cochrane found that almost the entire French fleet was at his mercy, and signaled to Gambier suggesting that if he would lead the British fleet into the Roads they could destroy the entire French force. Gambier did not respond, and eventually in frustration Cochrane led his own ship directly into combat. Unable to leave his subordinate unsupported, Gambier sent a small squadron of ships of the line to reinforce Cochrane, and on 12 April three French ships of the line, a frigate, and a large storeship were battered into surrender and then set on fire as damaged beyond repair.

Gambier then ordered the reinforcements to withdraw, leaving Cochrane again unsupported against the rest of the main French fleet which was gradually dragging itself off the shoals and into the relative safety of the Charente River. Cochrane renewed his attack on 13 April but was unable to cause any significant damage to the French ships as they threw stores and guns overboard to facilitate their escape. On the morning of 14 April Gambier directly ordered Cochrane to retire, turning command of the operation over to Captain George Wolfe. Cochrane reluctantly complied, and on 15 April sailed back to Britain with dispatches.

Wolfe renewed attacks on the remaining stranded ships of the French fleet over the next week, but with little effect. The battle concluded, Gambier sailed his fleet back to Britain. The engagement was a victory for the British, with five French ships destroyed and several others badly damaged, but there was much discontent in Britain, both among the Navy and the public, that a larger victory had been lost through over-caution. In the aftermath several French captains were subject to courts-martial, and one was shot for cowardice, while in Britain the acrimony between Cochrane and Gambier resulted in a dramatic court-martial of Gambier, in which he was sensationally acquitted.

== British fleet ==
Note that as carronades were not traditionally taken into consideration when calculating a ship's rate, these ships may have been carrying more guns than indicated below.

- Ships in this colour were destroyed during the Battle of the Basque Roads

=== Inshore Squadron ===
Inshore squadron
Ship	Rate	Guns	Commander	Casualties			Notes
Ship	Rate	Guns	Commander	Killed	Wounded	Total	Notes
HMS Indefatigable	Frigate	44	Captain John Tremayne Rodd	0	0	0	Engaged on 12 April. Withdrawn on 13 April.
HMS Imperieuse	Frigate	38	Captain Lord Cochrane	3	11	14	Heavily engaged on 12–14 April. Withdrawn on 14 April.
HMS Aigle	Frigate	36	Captain George Wolfe	0	0	0	Engaged on 11–14 April. Remained until 24 April.
HMS Emerald	Frigate	36	Captain Frederick Lewis Maitland	0	0	0	Engaged on 11–12 April.
HMS Unicorn	Frigate	32	Captain Lucius Hardyman	0	0	0	Engaged on 11–12 April.
HMS Pallas	Frigate	32	Captain George Seymour	0	0	0	Engaged on 11–13 April.
HMS Mediator	Explosion ship		Captain James Wooldridge	1	4	5	Deliberately destroyed in the attack of 11 April.
HMS Beagle	Sloop	18	Captain Francis Newcombe	0	0	0	Heavily engaged 12–24 April.
HMS Doterel	Sloop	18	Commander Anthony Abdy	0	0	0	Engaged 12–24 April.
HMS Foxhound	Sloop	18	Commander Pitt Barnaby Greene	0	0	0	Engaged 12–24 April.
HMS Insolent	Brig	14	Lieutenant John Row Morris	0	0	0	Engaged 12–24 April.
HMS Insolent	Brig	12	Lieutenant James Hugh Talbot	0	0	0	Engaged 12–24 April.
HMS Conflict	Brig	12	Lieutenant Joseph B. Batt	0	0	0	Engaged 12–24 April.
HMS Contest	Brig	12	Lieutenant John Gregory	0	0	0	Engaged 12–24 April.
HMS Fervant	Brig	12	Lieutenant John Edward Hare	0	0	0	Engaged 12–24 April.
HMS Growler	Brig	12	Lieutenant Richard Crossman	0	0	0	Engaged 12–24 April.
HMS Lyra	Sloop	10	Commander William Bevians	0	0	0	Engaged 12–24 April.
HMS Redpole	Sloop	10	Captain John Joyce	0	0	0	Engaged 12–24 April.
HMS Thunder	Bomb		Captain James Caulfield	0	0	0	Engaged 20 – 24 April.
HMS Aetna	Bomb		Captain William Godfrey	0	0	0	Heavily engaged 11 – 24 April.
HMS Whiting	Rocket ship		Lieutenant Henry Wildey	0	0	0	Engaged 12–24 April.
Nimrod	Rocket ship			0	0	0	Engaged 12–24 April.
King George	Rocket ship			0	0	0	Engaged 12–24 April.
Total casualties: 4 killed, 15 wounded
Sources: James, pp. 94–129; Clowes, pp. 252–257; "No. 16248". The London Gazette. 21 April 1809. p. 538.

=== Gambier's fleet ===
Admiral Lord Gambier's Fleet
Ship	Rate	Guns	Commander	Casualties			Notes
Ship	Rate	Guns	Commander	Killed	Wounded	Total	Notes
HMS Caledonia	First rate	120	Admiral Lord Gambier; Captain Sir Harry Neale; Captain William Bedford	0	0	0	Did not participate in the battle.
HMS Caesar	Third rate	80	Rear-Admiral Robert Stopford; Captain Charles Richardson	4	0	4	Casualties incurred in a ship's boat during night attack on 11 April. Ship entered anchorage late on 12 April, withdrew without seeing action.
HMS Gibraltar	Third rate	80	Captain Henry Lidgbird Ball	0	1	1	Casualty incurred while serving on fireship, 11 April.
HMS Hero	Third rate	74	Captain James Newman-Newman	0	0	0	Did not participate in the battle.
HMS Donegal	Third rate	74	Captain Pulteney Malcolm	0	0	0	Did not participate in the battle.
HMS Resolution	Third rate	74	Captain George Burlton	0	0	0	Did not participate in the battle.
HMS Theseus	Third rate	74	Captain John Poer Beresford	0	1	1	Casualty incurred while serving on fireship, 11 April. Entered anchorage late on 12 April, withdrew without seeing action.
HMS Valiant	Third rate	74	Captain John Bligh	0	0	0	Entered anchorage on 12 April. Heavily engaged during the day. Withdrew on morning 13 April.
HMS Illustrious	Third rate	74	Captain William Robert Broughton	0	0	0	Did not participate in the battle.
HMS Bellona	Third rate	74	Captain Stair Douglas	0	0	0	Did not participate in the battle.
HMS Revenge	Third rate	74	Captain Alexander Robert Kerr	5	13	18	Entered anchorage on 12 April. Heavily engaged during the day. Withdrew on morning 13 April.
Total casualties: 9 killed, 15 wounded
Sources: James, pp. 94–129; Clowes, pp. 252–257; "No. 16248". The London Gazette. 21 April 1809. p. 538.

== French fleet ==
Officers killed in action are marked with a † symbol. Note that as obusiers were not traditionally taken into consideration when calculating a ship's rate, these ships may have been carrying more guns than indicated below. Note also that the French Navy used a different classification system from the British one (it was composed of five "ranks" rather than the British six rates), but the "Rate" column below shows the British equivalent only.

- Ships in this colour were destroyed before the Battle of the Basque Roads
- Ships in this colour were destroyed during the Battle of the Basque Roads

Allemand's fleet
Ship	Rate	Guns	Commander	Casualties			Notes
Ship	Rate	Guns	Commander	Killed	Wounded	Total	Notes
Océan	First rate	120	Contre-amiral Zacharie Allemand; Captain Pierre-Nicolas Rolland	c. 50	-	c. 50	Brest Fleet. c. 50 sailors killed fending off fireships on 11 April. Grounded and badly damaged. Reached safety on 15 April.
Foudroyant	Third rate	80	Contre-amiral Antoine Louis de Gourdon; Captain Antoine Henri	0	0	0	Brest Fleet. Grounded 12 April. Badly damaged but reached safety on 16 April.
Ville de Varsovie	Third rate	80	Captain Cuvillier	c. 100			Brest Fleet. Driven ashore and badly damaged on 11 April. Captured and later destroyed by British prize crew.
Tourville	Third rate	74	Captain Charles Nicolas Lacaille	0	0	0	Brest Fleet. Grounded and badly damaged. Reached safety on 16 April. Lacaille later court-martialed and dismissed.
Jean Bart	Third rate	74	Captain Charles Lebozec	-	-	-	Brest Fleet. Drove ashore accidentally on 26 February at Île Madame and became a total wreck.
Tonnerre	Third rate	74	Captain Nicolas Clément de la Roncière	0	0	0	Brest Fleet. Driven ashore and wrecked on 11 April. Burned by own crew.
Aquilon	Third rate	74	Captain Jacques-Rémy Maingon †	1	0	1	Brest Fleet. Driven ashore and badly damaged on 11 April. Captured and later destroyed by British prize crew. Captain killed by stray shot after surrender.
Régulus	Third rate	74	Captain Jean Jacques Etienne Lucas	0	0	0	Brest Fleet. Grounded and badly damaged. Reached safety on 29 April.
Cassard	Third rate	74	Captain Gilbert-Amable Faure	5	15	20	Rochefort squadron. Grounded 12 April. Reached safety on 13 April.
Jemmapes	Third rate	74	Captain Joseph Favreau	0	0	0	Rochefort squadron. Grounded 11 April. Reached safety on 12 April.
Patriote	Third rate	74	Captain Jean-Michel Mahé	0	0	0	Rochefort squadron. Grounded 11 April. Reached safety on 12 April.
Calcutta	Fourth rate	50	Captain Jean-Baptiste Lafon	0	12	12	Rochefort squadron. Armed en flute. Driven ashore and badly damaged on 11 April. Captured and destroyed by British prize crew. Lafon later court-martialed and shot for cowardice.
Indienne	Frigate	40	Captain Guillaume-Marcelin Proteau	0	0	0	Brest Fleet. Driven ashore and badly damaged on 11 April. Destroyed by own crew on 16 April.
Elbe	Frigate	40	Captain Jacques François Bellenger	0	0	0	Brest Fleet. Grounded 11 April. Reached safety on 12 April.
Pallas	Frigate	40	Captain Armand François Le Bigot	0	0	0	Rochefort squadron. Grounded 11 April. Reached safety on 12 April.
Hortense	Frigate	40	Captain Emmanuel Halgan	0	0	0	Rochefort squadron. Grounded 11 April. Reached safety on 12 April.
Nisus	Brig			-	-	-	Brest Fleet.
Total casualties: 150-200 casualties
Sources: James, pp. 94–129; Clowes, pp. 252–257; "No. 16248". The London Gazette. 21 April 1809. p. 538.

== Notes ==
1. Note A: The French fleet that arrived at Basque Roads on 24 February was commanded by Jean-Baptiste Willaumez. There was dissatisfaction among the French fleet that Willaumez had not attacked Stopford when he enjoyed numerical superiority, taking the opportunity to break out of the anchorage and pursue his objectives in the Caribbean. Captain Jacques Bergeret of Ville de Varsovie was so incensed that he wrote a letter criticising Willaumez to the Minister of Marine Denis Decrès, warning that the Aix Roads were highly vulnerable to British attack. Although Emperor Napoleon apparently shared Bergeret's opinion of Willaumez, Decrès removed and censured both Willaumez and Bergeret, replacing the admiral with Zacharie Allemand on 16 March.

== Bibliography ==
- Adkins, Roy & Lesley (2006). The War for All the Oceans. Abacus. ISBN 978-0-349-11916-8.
- Clowes, William Laird (1997) [1900]. The Royal Navy, A History from the Earliest Times to 1900, Volume V. London: Chatham Publishing. ISBN 1-86176-014-0.
- Cochrane, Thomas (2000) [1860]. The Autobiography of a Seaman. London: Lyons Press. ISBN 1-58574-061-6.
- Cordingley, David (2007). Cochrane the Dauntless. London: Bloomsbury Publishing. ISBN 978-0-7475-8088-1.
- James, William (2002) [1827]. The Naval History of Great Britain, Volume 5, 1808–1811. London: Conway Maritime Press. ISBN 0-85177-909-3.
