= Guillaume-Marcelin Proteau =

French naval officer (1772–1837)

- Born: 2 May 1772; Groix, Morbihan, France
- Died: 21 September 1837 (aged 65); Lorient, Morbihan, France
- Military career
- Allegiance: First French Republic; First French Empire; Kingdom of France
- Rank: Capitaine de vaisseau General de brigade
- Conflicts: French Revolutionary Wars; Napoleonic Wars; Battle of Basque Roads
- Awards: Viscount; Commandeur of the Legion of Honour; Chevalier of the Order of Saint Louis

Guillaume-Marcelin Proteau (French pronunciation: [ɡijom maʁsəlɛ̃ pʁɔto]; 2 May 1772 – 21 September 1837) was a French naval officer and later army general during the French Revolutionary and Napoleonic Wars.

== Service ==
Proteau was born on the island of Groix in Morbihan in 1772 and joined the French Navy after the French Revolution in 1793. In December 1796 he served with the fleet which participated in the Expédition d'Irlande, a failed attempt to invade the Kingdom of Ireland with an army led by Lazare Hoche as Lieutenant on a ship named l'Aigle, and was made a prisoner at Bantry.

Proteau was named capitaine de frégate on 24 September 1799, and on 7 January 1801, he was given command of the frigate Indienne. He was promoted to capitaine de vaisseau on 24 September 1803 and remained in command of Indienne. He was made chevalier of the Legion of Honour on 4 February 1804, and was advanced to officier of the order on 14 June 1804.

In February 1809, Indienne was with the fleet which sailed from Brest and became trapped in the Basque Roads. On 12 April 1809, the fleet was attacked by British fireships at the Battle of the Basque Roads, and Indienne was driven ashore and later destroyed. Proteau faced a court-martial, and was condemned to three months' house arrest for abandoning his ship too hastily.

On 19 June 1811, he was given command of the 17th squadron, but on 22 March 1812 he was sent to Russia, joining the garrison of Pillau. On 16 May 1813, he was made an adjudant commandant in the Grande Armée, and was promoted to général de brigade on 6 November 1813, commanding the grand quartier général of the Grande Armée. After the Bourbon Restoration, he was made a chevalier de Saint-Louis on 21 August 1814, and in October 1814, he was sent by Louis XVIII, to Kœnigsberg in Prussia, to negotiate the return of French prisoners of war. He was promoted to commandeur de la Légion d'honneur on 27 December 1814. During the Hundred Days, he was given command of the Hautes-Alpes department on 26 March 1815, and then took command at Cherbourg on 20 May 1815. Between 9 January 1816 and 1832, he commanded several departments.

Proteau was created a vicomte in 1823, by King Louis XVIII, and retired in 1834. He died on 21 September 1837, at Lorient. A barracks at Cherbourg is named after Proteau, accommodating the École des applications militaires de l'énergie atomique.
