= French ship Tonnerre (1808) =

Ship of the line of the French Navy

- Scale model of Achille, sister ship of French ship Tonnerre (1808), on display at the Musée national de la Marine in Paris.

History

France
- Name: Tonnerre
- Ordered: 16 April 1794
- Laid down: 22 September 1794
- Launched: 9 June 1808
- Commissioned: 21 July 1808
- Renamed: Quatorze Juillet (1795)
- Fate: Burned and exploded 12 April 1809

General characteristics
- Class & type: Téméraire-class ship of the line
- Displacement: 3,069 tonneaux
- Tons burthen: 1,537 port tonneaux
- Length: 55.87 metres (183.3 ft) (172 pied)
- Beam: 14.90 metres (48 ft 11 in)
- Draught: 7.26 metres (23.8 ft) (22 pied)
- Propulsion: Up to 2,485 m^{2} (26,748 sq ft) of sails
- Armament: 74 guns: Lower gundeck: 28 × 36-pounder long guns; Upper gundeck: 30 × 18-pounder long guns; Forecastle and Quarter deck: 16 × 8-pounder long guns; 4 × 36-pounder carronades
- Armour: Timber

Tonnerre was a 74-gun Téméraire-class ship of the line built for the French Navy during the first decade of the 19th century.

Tonnerre′s keel was laid at Brest, France, on 22 July 1794, but she was not launched until 9 June 1808. She was commissioned on 21 July 1808. Under Captain Émile François Guillaume Clément, comte de la Roncière, she joined the Rochefort squadron in February 1809.

By April 1809, Tonnerre was among ships of the French Atlantic Fleet blockaded by British Royal Navy warships at Basque Roads at the mouth of the Charente on the Biscay coast of France. The British attacked on 11 April 1809 with fireships, beginning the lengthy Battle of the Basque Roads, and while adrift during the fireship attack, Tonnerre collided with the grounded flagship of the French fleet, the 120-gun ship of the line Océan, on Océan′s starboard side while Océan′s crew was trying to fend off a fireship that had struck Océan′s stern. Tonnerre inflicted serious damage on Océan, although she quickly detached, allowing Océan′s crew to return their attention to the fireship.

During the night of 11–12 April 1809, Tonnerre went hard aground in Basque Roads near Île Madame at low tide, flooded, and became a wreck. Late on the afternoon of 12 April, about two hours after the British resumed the battle with a bombardment of the French fleet, Tonnerre′s crew set her on fire to prevent her capture by the British and abandoned ship. At 19:30, about two hours after her crew abandoned her, Tonnerre exploded when the flames reached her magazine.

On 21 June 1809, Tonnerre′s commanding officer was court martialed on charges of abandoning his ship too easily and failing to follow orders. He was acquitted of both charges.
