= Battle of the Basque Roads =

1809 naval battle during the Napoleonic Wars

- Part of the Napoleonic Wars
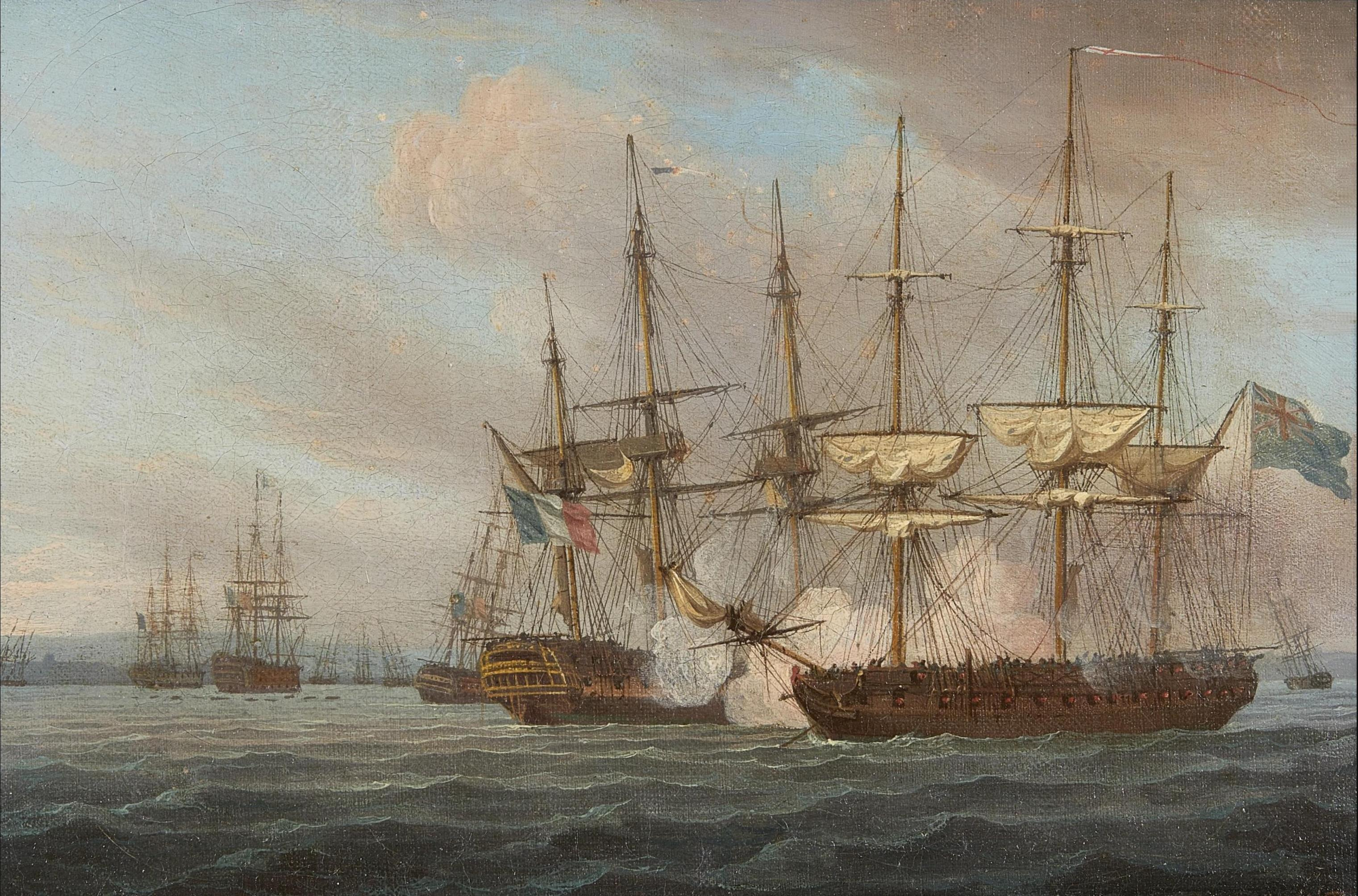
- Destruction of the French Fleet in Basque Roads; Thomas Whitcombe, 1817
Date	11–24 April 1809
Location	Roads of Île-d'Aix, Basque Roads 46.00°N 1.19°W
Result	British victory

Belligerents
United Kingdom	France

Commanders and leaders
James Gambier; Thomas Cochrane	Zacharie Allemand

Strength
11 ships of the line; 7 frigates; 4 brig-sloops; 2 bomb vessels; 6 brigs; 1 schooner; 2 cutters; 3 rocket barges (OOB)	11 ships of the line; 4 frigates (OOB)

Casualties and losses
13 killed 30 wounded	150–200 killed or wounded; 3 ships of the line destroyed; 1 ship of the line scuttled; 1 frigate scuttled

The Battle of the Basque Roads, also known as the Battle of Aix Roads (French: Bataille de l'île d'Aix, also Affaire des brûlots, rarely Bataille de la rade des Basques), was a major naval battle of the Napoleonic Wars, fought in the narrow Basque Roads at the mouth of the Charente River on the Biscay coast of France. The battle, which lasted from 11 to 24 April 1809, was unusual in that it pitted a hastily assembled squadron of small and unorthodox British Royal Navy warships against the main strength of the French Atlantic Fleet. The circumstances were dictated by the cramped, shallow coastal waters in which the battle was fought. The battle is also notorious for its controversial political aftermath in both Britain and France.

In February 1809 the French Atlantic Fleet, blockaded in Brest on the Breton coast by the British Channel Fleet, attempted to break out into the Atlantic and reinforce the garrison of Martinique. Sighted and chased by British blockade squadrons, the French were unable to escape the Bay of Biscay and eventually anchored in the Basque Roads, near the naval base of Rochefort. There they were kept under observation during March by the British fleet under the dour Admiral Lord Gambier. The Admiralty, desiring an attack on the French fleet, ordered Lord Cochrane, an outspoken and popular junior captain, to lead an attack, over the objections of a number of senior officers. Cochrane organised an inshore squadron of fireships and bomb vessels, including a converted frigate, and personally led this force into Basque Roads on the evening of 11 April.

The attack caused little direct damage, but in the narrow waters of the channel the fireships panicked the sailors of the French fleet and most of their ships grounded and were left immobile. Cochrane expected Gambier to follow his attack with the main fleet, which could then destroy the vulnerable French force, but Gambier refused. Cochrane continued the battle over the next several days, successfully destroying several French ships, but with little support from Gambier. This allowed most of the French fleet to refloat and retreat up the Charente to safety. Gambier recalled Cochrane on 14 April and sent him back to Britain, withdrawing most of the inshore squadron at the same time, although scattered fighting continued until 24 April. The increasingly marginalised French fleet was badly damaged and trapped in its home ports; several captains were court-martialled for cowardice and one was shot.

In Britain the battle was celebrated as a victory, but many in the Navy were dissatisfied with Gambier's behaviour and Cochrane used his position as a Member of Parliament to publicly protest Gambier's leadership. Incensed, Gambier requested a court-martial to disprove Cochrane's accusations and Gambier's political allies ensured that the jury comprised his supporters. After bitter and argumentative proceedings Gambier was exonerated of any culpability for failings during the battle. Cochrane's naval career was ruined, although he remained a prominent figure in Britain for decades to come. Historians have almost unanimously condemned Gambier for his failure to support Cochrane.

== Background ==
By 1809 the Royal Navy was dominant in the Atlantic. The French fleet had lost its best ships and sailors in the Battle of the Nile, and had yet to recover. During the Trafalgar Campaign of 1805 and the Atlantic campaign of 1806 the French Atlantic Fleet had suffered more naval losses and the survivors were trapped in the French Biscay ports under a close blockade by the British Channel Fleet. The largest French base was at Brest in Brittany, where the main body of the French fleet lay at anchor under the command of Counter-admiral Jean-Baptiste Willaumez, with smaller French detachments stationed at Lorient and Rochefort. These ports were under observation by the Channel Fleet, led off Brest by Admiral Lord Gambier. Gambier was an unpopular officer, whose reputation rested on being the first captain to break the French line at the Glorious First of June in 1794 in HMS Defence. Since then he had spent most of his career as an administrator at the Admiralty, earning the title Baron Gambier for his command of the fleet at the Bombardment of Copenhagen in 1807. A strict Methodist, Gambier was nicknamed "Dismal Jimmy" by his men.

=== Willaumez's cruise ===
British superiority at sea allowed the Royal Navy to launch operations against the French Overseas Empire with impunity, in particular against the lucrative French colonies in the Caribbean. In late 1808, the French learned that a British invasion of Martinique was in preparation, and so orders were sent to Willaumez to take his fleet to sea, concentrate with the squadrons from Lorient and Rochefort and reinforce the island. With Gambier's fleet off Ushant Willaumez was powerless to act, and it was only when winter storms forced the blockade fleet to retreat into the Atlantic in February 1809 that the French admiral felt able to put to sea, passing southwards through the Raz de Sein at dawn on 22 February with eight ships of the line and two frigates. Gambier had left a single ship of the line, Captain Charles Paget's HMS Revenge to keep watch on Brest, and Paget observed the French movements at 09:00, correctly deducing Willaumez's next destination.

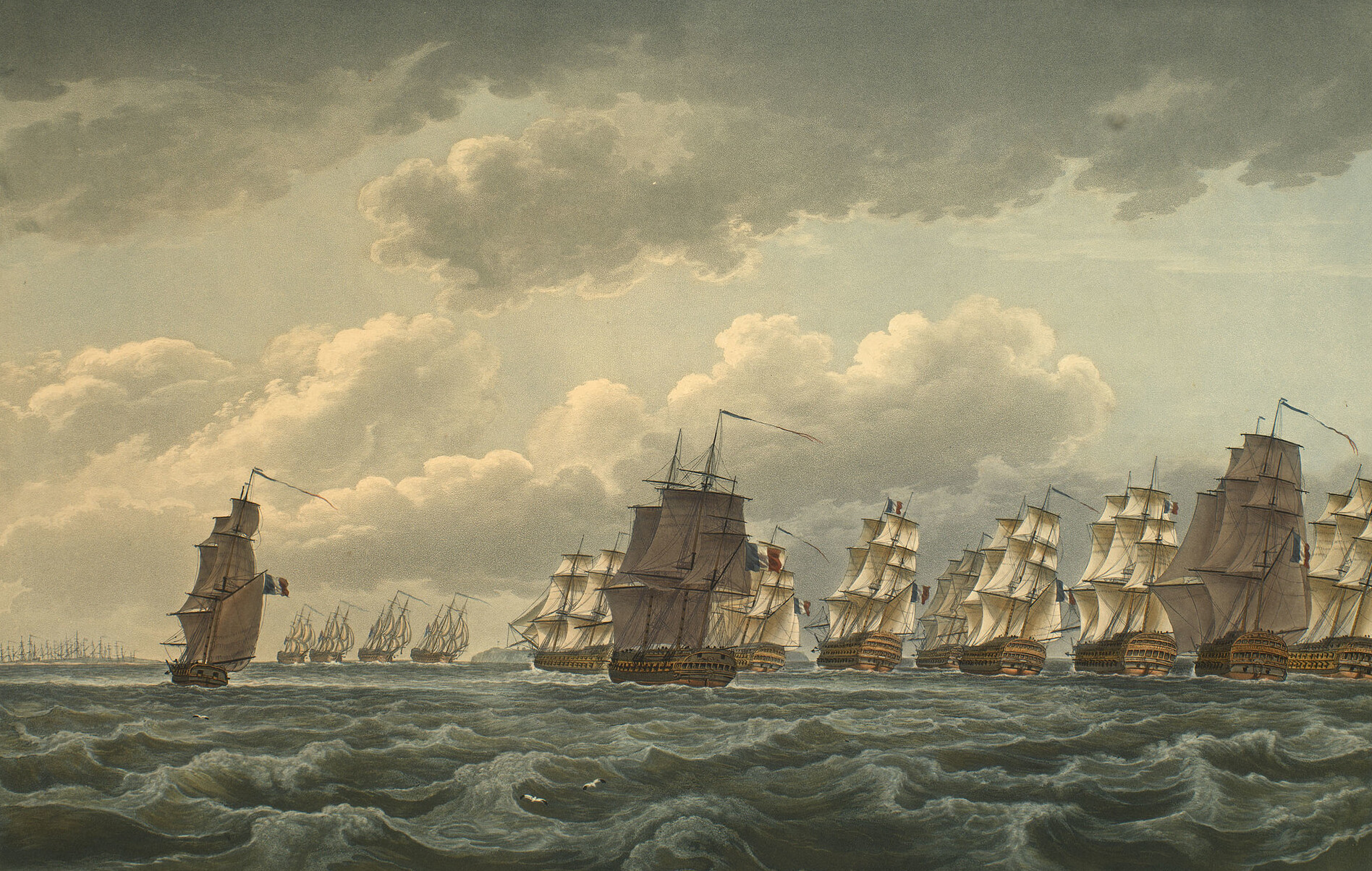
The British navy, led by Theseus, preventing the French Mediterranean Squadron from joining with the Brest Squadron near the Isle de Groix on 21 February 1809.

The blockade squadron off Lorient comprised the ships of the line HMS Theseus, HMS Triumph and HMS Valiant under Commodore John Beresford, watching three ships in the harbour under Counter-admiral Amable Troude. At 15:15 Paget, who had lost sight of the French, reached the waters off Lorient and signalled a warning to Beresford. At 16:30, Beresford's squadron sighted Willaumez's fleet, tacking to the southeast. Willaumez ordered his second-in-command, Counter-admiral Antoine Louis de Gourdon to drive Beresford away and Gourdon brought four ships around to chase the British squadron, with the remainder of the French fleet following more distantly. Beresford turned away to the northwest, thus clearing the route to Lorient. His objective achieved, Gourdon rejoined Willaumez and the fleet sailed inshore, anchoring near the island of Groix.

In the early morning of 23 February, Willaumez sent the dispatch schooner Magpye into Lorient with instructions for Troude to sail when possible and steer for the Pertuis d'Antioche near Rochefort, where the fleet was due to assemble. Willaumez then took his fleet southwards, followed from 09:00 by Beresford's squadron. The French fleet passed between Belle Île and Quiberon and then around Île d'Yeu, passing the Phares des Baleines on Île de Ré at 22:30. There the fleet was sighted by frigate HMS Amethyst under Captain Michael Seymour, the scout for the Rochefort blockade squadron of HMS Caesar, HMS Defiance and HMS Donegal under Rear-Admiral Robert Stopford, which was anchored off the Phare de Chassiron on Ile d'Oléron. Signal rockets from Amethyst alerted Stopford to Willaumez's presence and Stopford closed with Willaumez during the night, but was not strong enough to oppose his entry into the Basque Roads at the mouth of the Charente River on the morning of 24 February.

=== Gambier's blockade ===
Assuming that the French fleet had sailed from Brest, Stopford sent the frigate HMS Naiad under Thomas Dundas to warn Gambier. The British commander had discovered the French fleet missing from its anchorage on 23 February and responded by sending eight ships under Rear-Admiral John Thomas Duckworth south to block any French attempt to enter the Mediterranean while Gambier turned his flagship, the 120-gun first rate HMS Caledonia, back to Plymouth for reinforcements. In the English Channel Naiad located Caledonia and passed on Stopford's message. Gambier continued to Plymouth, collected four ships of the line anchored there, and immediately sailed back into the Bay of Biscay, joining Stopford on 7 March to form a fleet of 13 ships, later reduced to 11 after Defiance and Triumph were detached.

Shortly after departing Stopford's squadron off the Basque Roads, Naiad had sighted three sail approaching from the north at 07:00 on 24 February. These were Italienne, Calypso and Cybèle; a French frigate squadron sent from Lorient by Troude, whose ships of the line had been delayed by unfavourable tides. The lighter frigates had put to sea without the battle squadron and sailed to join Willaumez the previous morning. Their passage had been observed by the British frigate HMS Amelia and the sloop HMS Doterel, which had shadowed the French during the night. To the south, Dundas had signaled Stopford and the admiral left Amethyst and HMS Emerald to observe the French fleet while he took his main squadron in pursuit of the French frigates. Trapped between the two British forces, French Commodore Pierre-Roch Jurien took his ships inshore under the batteries of Les Sables d'Olonne. Stopford followed the French into the anchorage and in the ensuing battle drove all three French frigates ashore where they were damaged beyond repair.

Willaumez made no move to challenge Stopford or Gambier, although he had successfully united with the Rochefort squadron of three ships of the line, two frigates and an armed storeship, the captured British fourth rate ship Calcutta, commanded by Commodore Gilbert-Amable Faure. Together the French fleet, now numbering 11 ships of the line, withdrew from the relatively open Basque Roads anchorage into the narrow channel under the batteries of the Île-d'Aix known as the Aix Roads. These waters offered greater protection from the British fleet, but were also extremely hazardous; on 26 February, as the French manoeuvred into the shallower waters of their new anchorage the 74-gun Jean Bart grounded on the Palles Shoal off Île Madame, and was wrecked. The channel in which Willaumez chose to position his fleet formed a strong defensive position: an assailant had to cross the open Basque Roads and advance past the long and dangerous Boyart Shoal hidden just below the surface. On entering the channel, an attacking force would then come under fire from fortified gun batteries on Île-d'Aix before finally encountering the French fleet. The anchorage had been successfully attacked before, such as during the Raid on Rochefort in 1757, but more recent efforts in 1803, and 1807 had ended in failure.

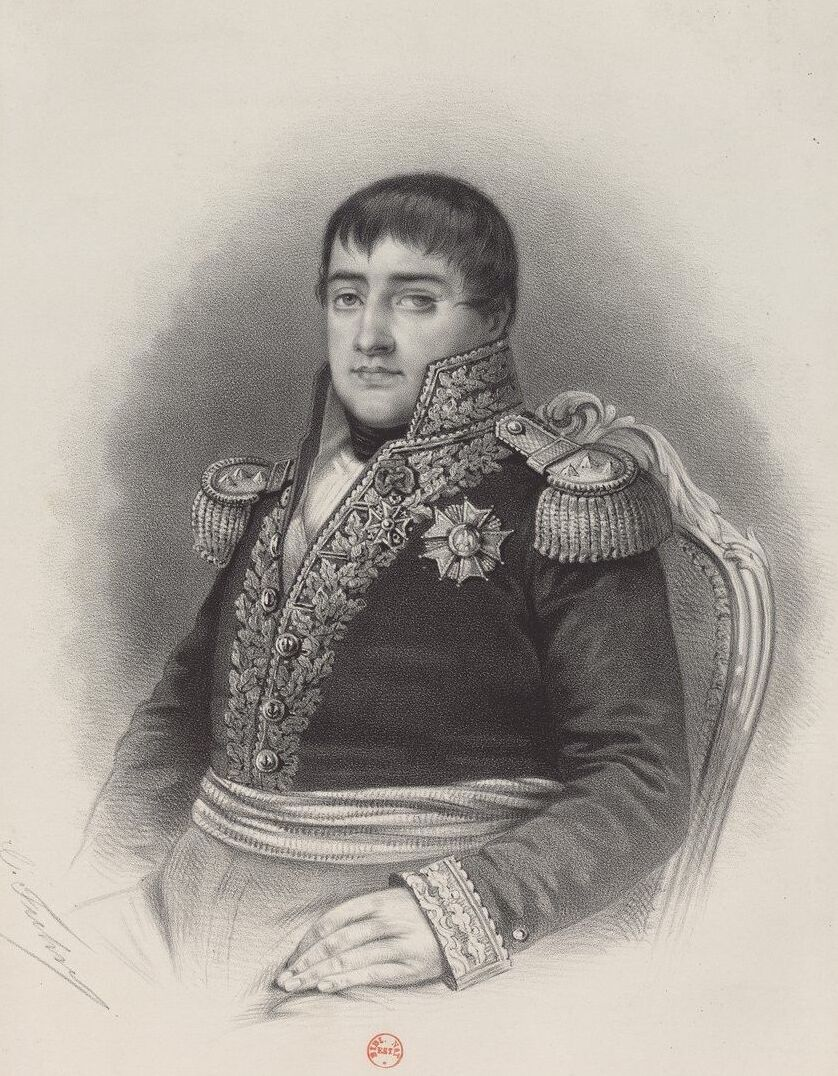
Zacharie Allemand, the French commander at the battle

The developing stalemate saw activity on both sides of the bay. Among the French fleet there was dissatisfaction that Willaumez had not attacked Stopford when he enjoyed numerical superiority, taking the opportunity to break out of the anchorage and pursue his objectives in the Caribbean. Captain Jacques Bergeret was so incensed that he wrote a letter criticising Willaumez to the Minister of Marine Denis Decrès, and warning that the Aix Roads were highly vulnerable to British attack. Although Napoleon apparently shared Willaumez's opinion, Decrès removed and censured both Willaumez and Bergeret, replacing the admiral with Vice-admiral Zacharie Allemand on 16 March. Word had arrived that a British expeditionary force had captured Martinique in late February, and so Allemand, lacking further instructions, prepared his defences.

The French position was strengthened with a heavy boom formed from chains and tree trunks laid between the Boyart shoal and Île-d'Aix. This boom measured 0.5 nautical miles (1,000 yd) long and 31.5 inches (80 cm) wide, weighted in place with 5 1/4 tons of anchors, and yet was installed so subtly that the British fleet did not observe it. More than 2,000 French conscripts were deployed on the Île-d'Aix, supporting batteries of 36-pounder long guns, although attempts to build a fort on the Boyart Shoal were identified, and on 1 April Amelia attacked the battery, drove off the construction crew and destroyed the half-finished fortification. Allemand also ordered his captains to take up a position known as a lignée endentée, in which his ships anchored to form a pair of alternating lines across the channel so that approaching warships could come under the combined fire of several ships at once, in effect crossing the T of any attempt to assault the position, with the frigates stationed between the fleet and the boom.

In the British fleet there was much debate about how to proceed against the French. Gambier was concerned that an attack by French fireships on his fleet anchored in the Basque Roads might cause considerable destruction, and consequently ordered his captains to prepare to withdraw from the blockade at short notice should such an operation be observed. He also wrote to the Admiralty in London recommending British fireships be prepared but cautioning that "it is a horrible mode of warfare, and the attempt very hazardous, if not desperate". A number of officers in the fleet, in particular Rear-Admiral Eliab Harvey, volunteered to lead such an attack, but Gambier hesitated to act, failing to take soundings of the approaches or make any practical preparations for an assault.

=== Mulgrave's imperative ===
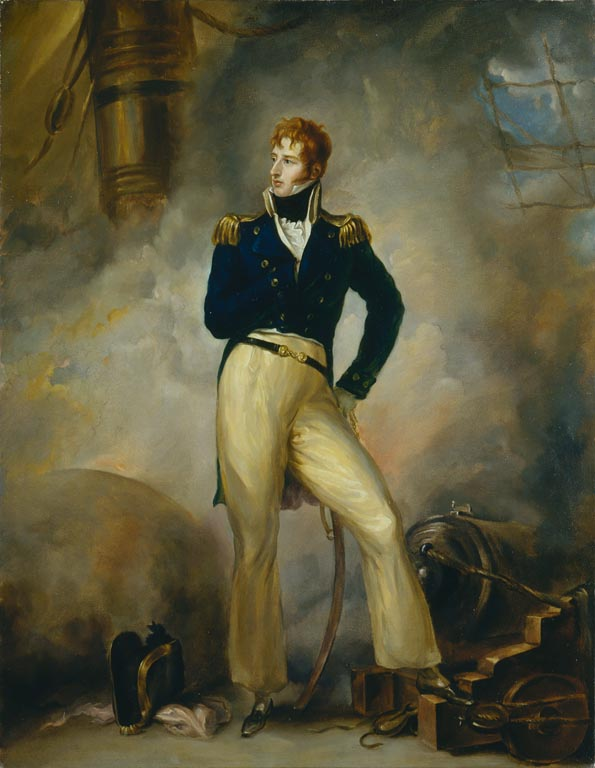
Copy of an 1807 portrait of Lord Cochrane

With Gambier vacillating in Basque Roads, First Lord of the Admiralty Lord Mulgrave interceded. Prime Minister Lord Portland's administration was concerned by the risk posed by the French fleet to the profits of the British colonies in the West Indies, and had determined that an attack must be made. Thus on 7 March ten fireships were ordered to be prepared. In considering who would be best suited to lead such an attack Mulgrave then made a highly controversial decision. On 11 March the frigate HMS Imperieuse anchored at Plymouth and a message instructed Captain Lord Cochrane to come straight to the Admiralty. Cochrane was an aggressive and outspoken officer who had risen to fame at the action of 6 May 1801 when he captured the 32-gun Spanish xebec-frigate El Gamo with the 14-gun brig HMS Speedy. In the frigates HMS Pallas and Imperieuse he had caused havoc on the French and Spanish coasts with relentless attacks on coastal shipping and defences including, most relevantly, operations in the Rochefort area. He was also a highly active politician, elected as a Member of Parliament for Westminster in 1807 as a Radical. He advocated parliamentary reform and was a fierce critic of Portland's administration.

At his meeting with Mulgrave, Cochrane was asked to explain a plan of attack on Basque Roads which he had drawn up some years previously. Cochrane enthusiastically described his intention to use fireships and massive floating bombs to destroy a fleet anchored in the roads. When he had finished, Mulgrave announced that the plan was going ahead and that Cochrane was to command it. Cochrane was in poor health, and under no illusions about Mulgrave's intentions: should the attack fail Cochrane would be blamed and his political career damaged. In addition, Cochrane was also well aware of the fury this decision would provoke in the naval hierarchy; the appointment of a relatively junior officer in command of such an important operation was calculated to cause offense. Cochrane refused, even though Mulgrave pleaded that he had been the only officer to present a practical plan for attacking Allemand's fleet. Again Cochrane refused the command, but the following day Mulgrave issued a direct order: "My Lord you must go. The board cannot listen to further refusal or delay. Rejoin your frigate at once."

Cochrane returned to Imperieuse immediately and the frigate then sailed from Plymouth to join Gambier. The admiral had received direct orders from Mulgrave on 26 March ordering him to prepare for an attack, to which he sent two letters, one agreeing with the order and another disputing it on the grounds that the water was too shallow and the batteries on Île-d'Aix too dangerous. Gambier did not however learn of the leadership of the operation until Cochrane joined the fleet on 3 April and presented Mulgrave's orders to the admiral. The effect was dramatic; Harvey, one of Nelson's Band of Brothers who had fought at Trafalgar, launched into a furious tirade directed at Gambier, accusing him of incompetence and malicious conduct, comparing him unfavourably to Nelson and calling Cochrane's appointment an "insult to the fleet". Gambier dismissed Harvey, sending him and his 80-gun HMS Tonnant back to Britain in disgrace to face a court-martial, and then ordered Cochrane to begin preparations for the attack. Gambier also issued Cochrane with Methodist tracts to distribute to his crew. Cochrane ignored the order, but sent some of the tracts to his friend William Cobbett with a letter describing conditions with the fleet. Cobbett, a Radical journalist, wrote articles in response which later inflamed religious opinion in Britain against Cochrane during the scandal which followed the battle.

== Night attack ==
Map illustrating the position of the anchored French fleet shortly before the British attack on the night of 11 April

=== Cochrane's plan ===
As the 18 fireships prepared in Britain by Mulgrave had not yet departed by the time of Cochrane's arrival with the fleet, the captain responded by converting his own over the following week. A number of chasse-marées carrying tar and resin perfect for this role had been captured by the blockade, and Cochrane requisitioned eight military transport ships from the fleet reserve for conversion using these materials. The frigate-storeship HMS Mediator was taken over to be the centrepiece of the attack force. These vessels were laden with explosives and combustible materials such as rum-soaked hay, and crewed by volunteers from the fleet. On three of the vessels Cochrane had loaded 1,500 barrels of gunpowder, topped by hundreds of artillery shells and thousands of grenades to create an explosion ship, a floating bomb of his own design intended to detonate right in the middle of the French line. During this process an attack by French boats on the fireships was driven off, with two British sailors killed and one wounded, and on 5 April Cochrane reconnoitered the approaches to Aix Roads, firing shots at the forts and fleet to gauge their responses. He subsequently wrote to Mulgrave suggesting that with an expeditionary force of 20,000 he could seize the defences overlooking the anchorage, sink blockships in the channel and thereby permanently deprive the French of one of their most important naval bases, although his letter was ignored.

On 6 April the bomb vessel HMS Aetna, equipped with a heavy mortar, arrived with William Congreve, inventor of a rocket artillery system which was to be used in the attack. It was followed by the first convoy of 12 fireships on 10 April, taking Cochrane's total to 24 fireships and explosion vessels to expend in his attack. With these ships was a transport carrying thousands of Congreve rockets, which were strapped to the masts and yards of the fireships to fire in all directions as the ships burned. Due to Gambier's failure to scout the channel, Cochrane was apparently unaware of the existence of the boom, although historian James Henderson suggests he knew of it but failed to inform Gambier lest the cautious admiral abandon the entire operation. Cochrane was intending that his force, led by the heavy Mediator and the explosion vessels, would enter the anchorage during the night and sow confusion among the French fleet. It was hoped that in the chaos some of the French ships might be destroyed by fire and others driven on shore where a concerted attack by the British fleet would destroy or capture the remainder. Allemand could see the fireships under preparation in Basque Roads, and increased his defences by stationing 73 small boats along the boom to tow fireships onto the mud flats and away from the French fleet. He also ordered all the ships of the line to remove their sails and topmasts. This rendered them largely immobile but considerably less flammable. The frigates retained their rigging as they would be required to move in the event of a major attack.

His preparations complete, Cochrane ordered the attack for the evening of 11 April, although Gambier was reluctant to allow his sailors to support Cochrane in the operation, saying "if you choose to rush to self-destruction that is your own affair ... but it is my duty to take care of the lives of others, and I will not place the crews of the fireships in palpable danger". Cochrane was furious and after a bitter argument Gambier relented and gave permission for the attack to go ahead. He stationed Imperieuse near the Boyart Shoal to the north of the boom, approximately 2.5 nautical miles (4.6 km) from the French fleet, supported by frigates HMS Aigle, HMS Unicorn and HMS Pallas. This force would collect the crews of the fireships as they abandoned their blazing charges and rowed back towards the British line, and sloops HMS Redpole and HMS Lyra were equipped as light ships to guide the fireships into the channel. With these ships were the schooner HMS Whiting and cutters Nimrod and King George, all converted into floating rocket batteries. Aetna and two brigs anchored north of the forts on Île-d'Aix, while frigate Emerald and five smaller warships were to launch a diversionary attack to the east of the island. Gambier, with the main body of the fleet, moved closer to the entrance of Aix Roads, eventually anchoring 9 nautical miles (17 km) distant; it has been suggested by one historian that he may have done so in order that he could retreat out to sea easily should the French fleet attempt to attack him in the aftermath of a failed fireship assault.

=== Fireships advance ===
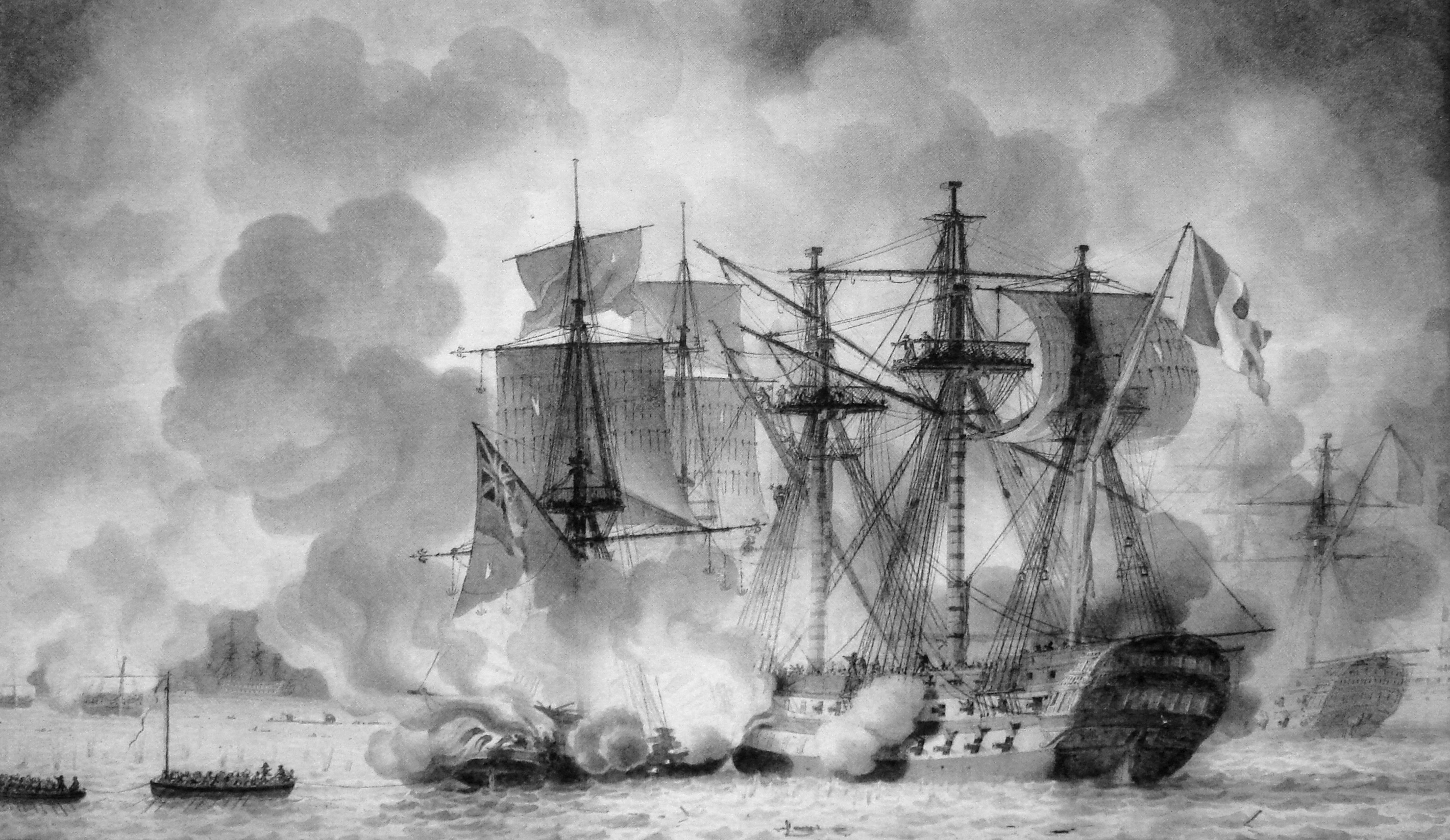
Régulus under attack by British fireships, during the evening of 11 April 1809. Louis-Philippe Crépin

As night approached it became clear that the wind, although blowing in the correct direction, was too strong to allow the fireships to be chained together in squadrons as planned, and each was instructed to operate independently. At 20:30, with the wind and tide in their favour and the night darker than expected, the fireships cut their anchor cables and began to silently sail towards the French fleet. Most of the volunteer crews ignited and abandoned their vessels too early, the blazing ships grounding long before even reaching the boom; one even threatened Imperieuse, which had to veer its anchor cable to avoid being destroyed. Other crews, including those on one of the explosion ships, lost control of their vessels and took no part in the attack. A few however, including the lead explosion ship under Cochrane's personal command, continued forward at speed, as the wind increased gradually. He was followed by the second surviving explosion vessel, on board of which was Midshipman Frederick Marryat. Cochrane delayed igniting his own ship to the last minute, and when he finally lit the fuses his escape was reportedly delayed in a search for the ship's dog. As a result, his boat was still inside the debris field when the ship exploded, although he escaped unharmed. Elsewhere, five British sailors were killed and six wounded in premature detonations. The explosion ships detonated near the French frigate Indienne at 21:30 and 21:40, although trapped by the boom they did little damage. Following them however was Mediator, which smashed a hole in the boom through which the few fireships surviving followed.

Allemand's boat crews were unable to influence the passage of Cochrane's flotilla as the sea was now too rough for them to operate in the channel, and the fireship crews consequently endured great difficulty returning to the British frigate line. The Aix Road was now a scene of "sublime horror": blazing fireships drifted randomly across the anchorage, some passing amid the great hulls of the French line. Shells from Aetna and thousands of rockets burst amid the confusion as the forts and all ships fired their guns at threats real and imagined; "a scene ... peculiarly awful and sublime." The fireships reached the French frigate line at 21:45, as the frigates cut their anchor cables and retreated southeast down the channel. The blazing vessels then struck the French line; Régulus was hit, the crew desperately fending off the fireship for 15 minutes while the drifting ship of the line crashed into Tourville. Cassard was also badly hit, losing 20 men killed and wounded to a shot from a fireship, and several other French ships were badly damaged in the confusion.

At 22:00, while avoiding three drifting fireships, the overladen 120-gun flagship Océan ran aground and was badly scorched by a fireship which struck the stern. To prevent explosion the stopcocks were opened and the magazine flooded. As the crew wrestled with this threat, the drifting Tonnerre and Patriote loomed out of the darkness. Patriote turned away in time, but Tonnerre crashed into the starboard side of the flagship and caused considerable damage, although fortunately detached soon afterwards. Océan's crew then held the blazing ship alongside long enough that the drifters could escape before releasing the fireship to drift on shore. During this effort at least 50 men tumbled to their deaths in the fiery chasm between the ships as they tried to prevent the fire spreading on board.

=== Gambier hesitates ===
This would have been the time to have destroyed them; but this favourable opportunity was neglected, which caused not a little murmuring among us, and was considered most unseamanlike by many experienced men in the fleet.
James Choyce, fireship volunteer

As dawn rose on 12 April, only Cassard and Foudroyant remained afloat, having drifted into the mouth of the Charente with the tide. The remainder, nine ships of the line, Calcutta and four frigates, were all beached along the mud and rocky shoals of the channel. Océan lay isolated on the mud within Aix Roads itself, with Ville de Varsovie and Aquilon grounded on rocks at Charenton 500 yards (460 m) away and Régulus and Jemmapes on softer ground nearby. To the north, Tonnerre had grounded hard near Île Madame and despite desperate efforts from the crew had already flooded and become a total wreck. Calcutta lay on the Palles Shoal near the remains of Jean Bart and Patriote and Tourville had grounded close to the mouth of the Charente not far from the frigate Pallas. Elsewhere Indienne lay at Pointe Aiguille and Elbe and Hortense on the Fontanelles.

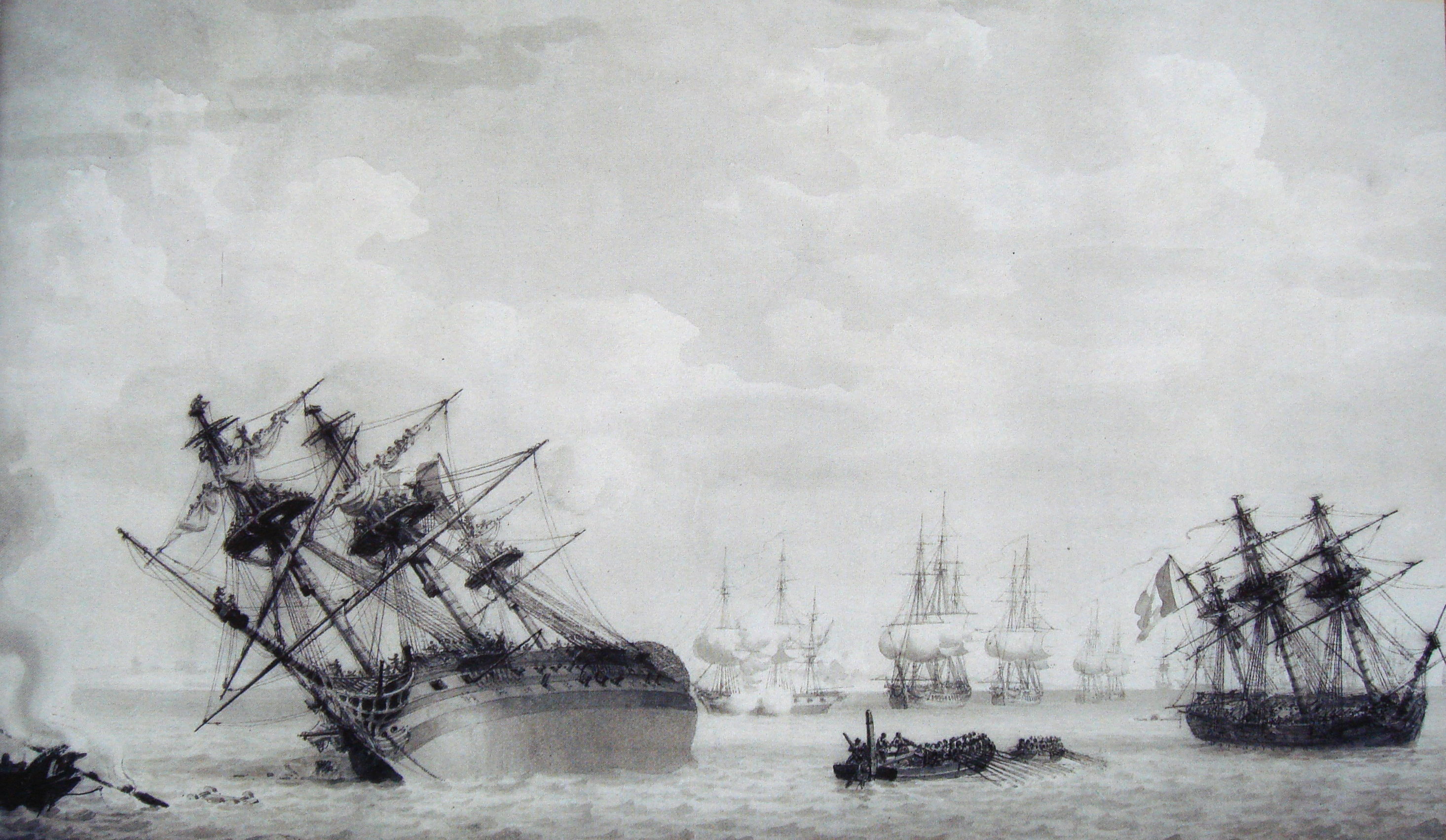
Régulus stranded on the shoals of Les Palles, 12 April 1809. Louis-Philippe Crépin

Cochrane, now back on Imperieuse, immediately recognised that although no French ship had been directly destroyed by the attack, there was an opportunity to annihilate the French Atlantic fleet in a single morning. Grounded and vulnerable, the isolated French ships could be simply destroyed by a concerted conventional attack on the Aix Roads, with only the batteries and the two remaining ships afloat to offer resistance. At 05:48 he frantically signalled Gambier "Half the fleet could destroy the enemy". Gambier acknowledged this communication, but made no reply and gave no orders. As the French ships started to drift with the tide, Cochrane sent more signals: at 06:40 "Eleven on shore", at 07:40 "Only two afloat". Still there was no response from the distant British fleet. At 09:30 Cochrane signalled that "Enemy preparing to heave off" as the French crews began the laborious task of refloating their ships. Cochrane ordered further, sardonic, signals "Two sail of the line are enough" and "the frigates alone can destroy the enemy", although the first was never made as the signal officer judged that it would be received by Gambier as an insult, and the second was made but never recorded in Caledonia's logbook. At 09:35 Gambier ordered his fleet to weigh anchor and then rescinded the order, instead holding a conference on the flagship for all his captains. Finally the fleet sailed at 10:45, but at 11:30 Gambier ordered a halt after only 3 nautical miles (5.6 km), and the ships anchored once more near Île-d'Aix while the admiral conducted a conference with his captains. In doing so, Gambier conspicuously avoided making any signal which might indicate he intended an attack, even spelling out some long signals to avoid using the flag which meant "prepare for battle". His behaviour at this point has been described by historian Robert Harvey as "one of the most contemptible acts of any commander-in-chief in British naval history".

While Gambier hesitated, one by one the French ships which had grounded began to refloat, although several grounded again. As they had removed their topmasts before the attack, they had survived the groundings with less damage than might otherwise have been the case, and were easier to kedge off. Foudroyant and Cassard, fearing an attack by the British fleet, retreated up the Charente at 12:45 and both then grounded at Fouras. At 13:00, Cochrane, his impatience and fury rising, deliberately allowed Imperieuse to drift stern-first alone down the channel towards the French fleet, flying the signal "The enemy's ships are getting under sail", followed by "the enemy is superior to the chasing ship", and then at 13:45 "the ship is in distress, and requires to be assisted immediately". He later wrote "It was better to risk the frigate, or even my commission, than suffer a disgraceful termination to the expectations of the Admiralty". At 14:00 the frigate was within range of Calcutta and began a steady fire into the beached storeship, supported by Aetna and several of the sloops, which he ordered into position by the unexpected process of firing cannon in their direction until they had moved to the position he intended. Cochrane had forced Gambier's hand: despite his desire to avoid combat, the admiral could not allow one of his frigates to fight the entire French fleet single-handed, and reluctantly he instructed the large frigate HMS Indefatigable, the smaller Emerald, Unicorn, Aigle and Pallas and the ships of the line Valiant and Revenge, the latter now commanded by Captain Alexander Robert Kerr, to join with the inshore squadron, enter the Aix Roads and support Cochrane.

== Cochrane's fight ==
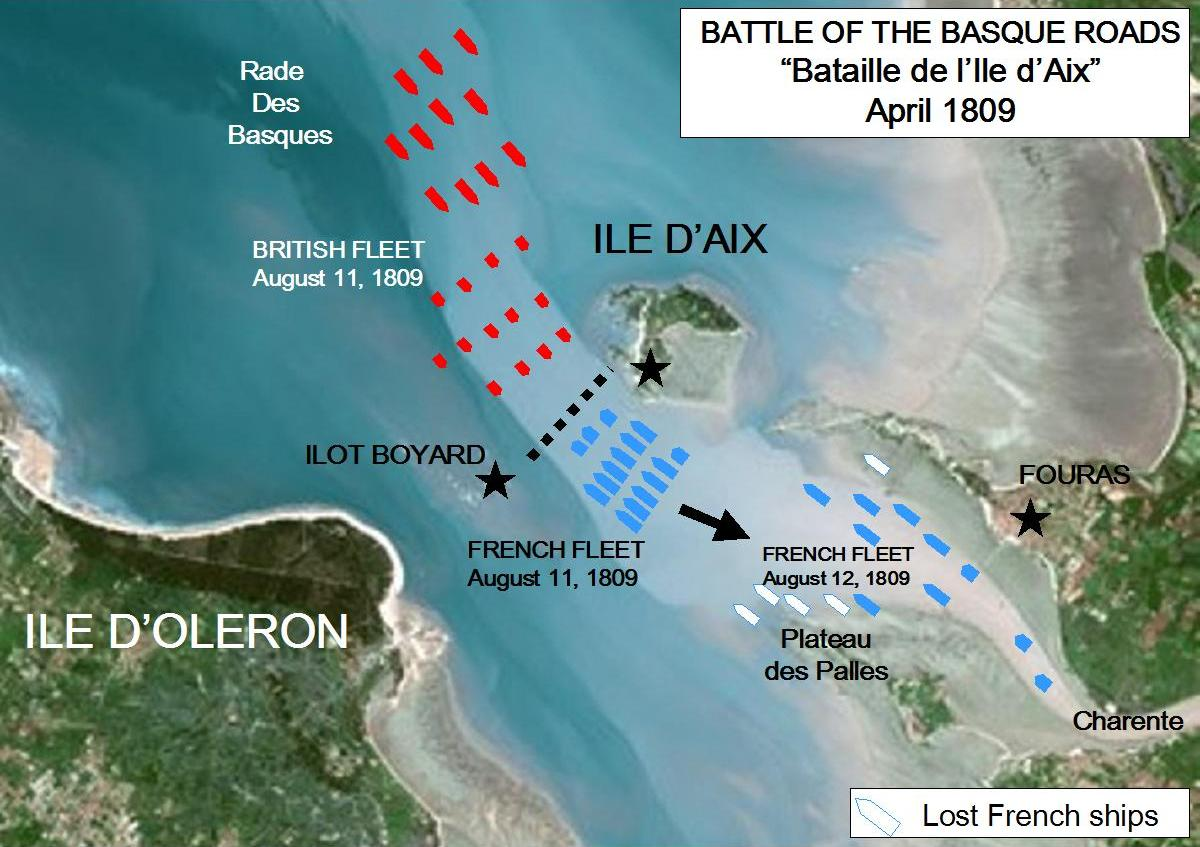
Full battle disposition and evolution of the battle

=== Gambier's reinforcements ===
British reinforcement entered Basque Roads at 15:20, just as the crew of Calcutta abandoned the ship, withdrawing across the shoal. Forming a line of battle, the British opened a heavy fire on the nearby, and still grounded, Ville de Varsovie while Beagle, armed with heavy carronades, nosed close inshore and took up station across the bow of Aquilon and raked the French ship repeatedly. For two hours these immobile French ships were battered by the British line with little reply, until at 17:30 both raised Union flags as an indication that they had surrendered. Shortly afterwards the crew of the wrecked Tonnerre abandoned their ship and set it on fire. The French ship was destroyed by a magazine explosion at 19:30, followed at 20:30 by Calcutta, which had been mistakenly set on fire by an over-enthusiastic British boarding party. The storeship was carrying a large quantity of munitions, reportedly worth over half a million pounds in value, and produced an enormous explosion. Most of the British ships had suffered only minor damage and casualties from fire from the gun batteries on Île-d'Aix, where Revenge had temporarily grounded during the night and suffered 18 casualties. The French losses were minor except on Ville de Varsovie, which had taken about 100 casualties in the exchange.

Although Gambier had no intention of risking his fleet in the narrow waters of Basque Roads, he had permitted three more transports to be fitted out as fireships, and at 17:30 these were led into the anchorage by Stopford in Caesar, accompanied by Theseus and several launches equipped to fire Congreve rockets. At 19:40 however Caesar grounded on a shoal and remained stuck there until 22:30, close to Valiant, which had also grounded at low tide. At this point six surviving French ships; Océan, four of the line and the frigate Indienne, remained aground close to the mouth of the Charente, while the remainder of the fleet had escaped upriver to secure anchorages. During the night the wind blew from the land, rendering a fireship attack impractical, and so the British contented themselves with setting Ville de Varsovie and Aquilon on fire, both ships determined by John Bligh on Valiant, over Cochrane's objections, to have been damaged beyond repair. During this operation, one of the new fireships was wrecked on a shoal. The weather was so bad that night that the planned attack with the remaining fireships was abandoned as unfeasible.

The sight of the burning wrecks in the night once again spread panic throughout the French fleet, the grounded ships opening a heavy fire on the scuttled ships in the assumption that they were fireships. Captain Lacaille of Tourville was so unnerved that he immediately ordered his crew to abandon ship and set it on fire. The evacuation was so hasty however that the fires did not spread effectively, and the following morning the ship was found to still be intact, the crew returning to their prematurely abandoned vessel. There they found that the ship's quartermaster Eugéne-Joseph-Romain Bourgeois had remained aboard, unconvinced by Lacaille's order, and had single-handedly driven off an attempt by a British boat to board and capture the ship. During the night about 30 sailors had joined him, keeping Touville in French hands until dawn came and the rest of the crew returned.

=== Battle continues ===
At 05:00 on 13 April Stopford gave the order for the inshore squadron to withdraw back to Gambier's fleet. Cochrane was again furious, and even suggested taking Imperieuse and Indefatigable on a desperate attack on the still-grounded Océan. Captain John Tremayne Rodd on the latter refused. Frustrated, Cochrane remained in the anchorage, joined by Pallas and the smaller vessels as the larger ships returned to more open waters. At 08:00 he ordered a renewed attack on the remaining grounded ships at the mouth of the Charente, and by 11:00 the small vessels were in position and opened fire on the French flagship. Although Aetna's gun split, forcing her withdrawal, the barrage otherwise continued throughout the day, although to little effect. It was not until 16:00 when the battered Océan and Régulus, most of their stores thrown overboard, were able to safely retreat towards the mouth of the Charente.

During this engagement three small rocket ships reached Cochrane, whose frigate was becalmed too far from the action, from the main fleet. On board, Gambier had sent a two-part letter. The first part praised Cochrane's achievements thus far and urged Cochrane to renew the attack on Océan but indicated that Gambier felt success was unlikely. The second part, a private letter to the captain, permitting one further attack but then ordering him to withdraw that evening as Gambier wished to "send you to England as soon as possible". Cochrane replied to the first part of the letter, stating that he would renew the assault on the following day, and pointedly ignored the second. Cochrane later claimed that Gambier had ordered him directly to withdraw by signal from Caledonia, but there is no evidence that such a signal was made.

=== Cochrane withdraws ===
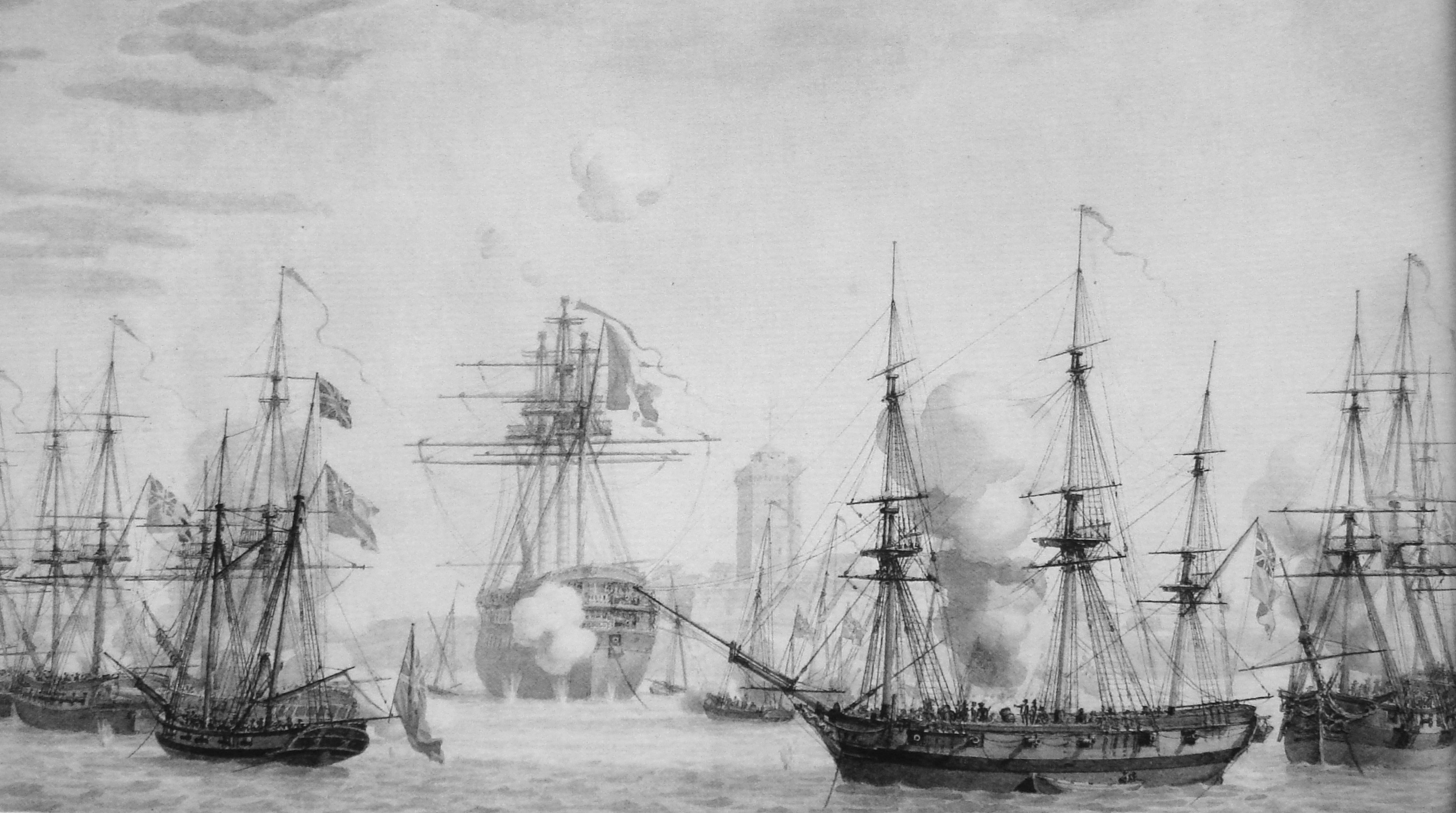
Régulus stranded in the mud in front of Fouras under attack by British ships, April 1809. Louis-Philippe Crépin

During the night the British did not renew the attack, and the following morning found that most of the French ships had successfully retreated up the Charente. Océan and Tourville remained accessible, both grounded anew near Foures, while a few other French ships could still be reached by long-range fire. At 09:00 Gambier made the definitive signal ordering Cochrane to withdraw directly and replacing him in command with George Wolfe on Aigle. Cochrane reluctantly returned to the fleet and had a furious meeting with Gambier, accusing the admiral of "extraordinary hesitation" and urging a new assault. Gambier refused to renew the attack and threatened that if Cochrane tried to blame Gambier for the incomplete victory he would be seen as "arrogantly claiming all the merit to yourself". Cochrane was immediately ordered to return to Britain, sailing on 15 April with Gambier's dispatches carried by Sir Harry Neale. Wolfe briefly renewed the attack during 14 April with a repaired Aetna, emptying the bomb vessel's ammunition reserves to little effect.

At 02:00 on 15 April Océan finally began to move again, reaching safety upriver by 03:30. Several other ships were exposed, but without a bomb vessel they lay beyond the range of the British fleet. The French sailors made significant efforts to retrieve these ships over the following days; on 16 April Indienne was deemed too damaged to be saved, abandoned, and set on fire. The frigate exploded at midday. The following day Foudroyant and Tourville reached safety, and only Régulus now remained vulnerable. For several days in severe gales and heavy rain the ship remained stranded in the mud while Wolfe worked to bring up newly arrived replacement bomb vessel HMS Thunder. An attack on 20 April failed after the gun split almost immediately, and a larger scale attack with both bomb vessels and smaller ships failed on 24 April. No further attempts were made to destroy Régulus, and on 29 April the ship was finally refloated and brought to safety in the Charente. On the same day Gambier finally abandoned his blockade of the river and sailed his fleet for England.

== Aftermath ==
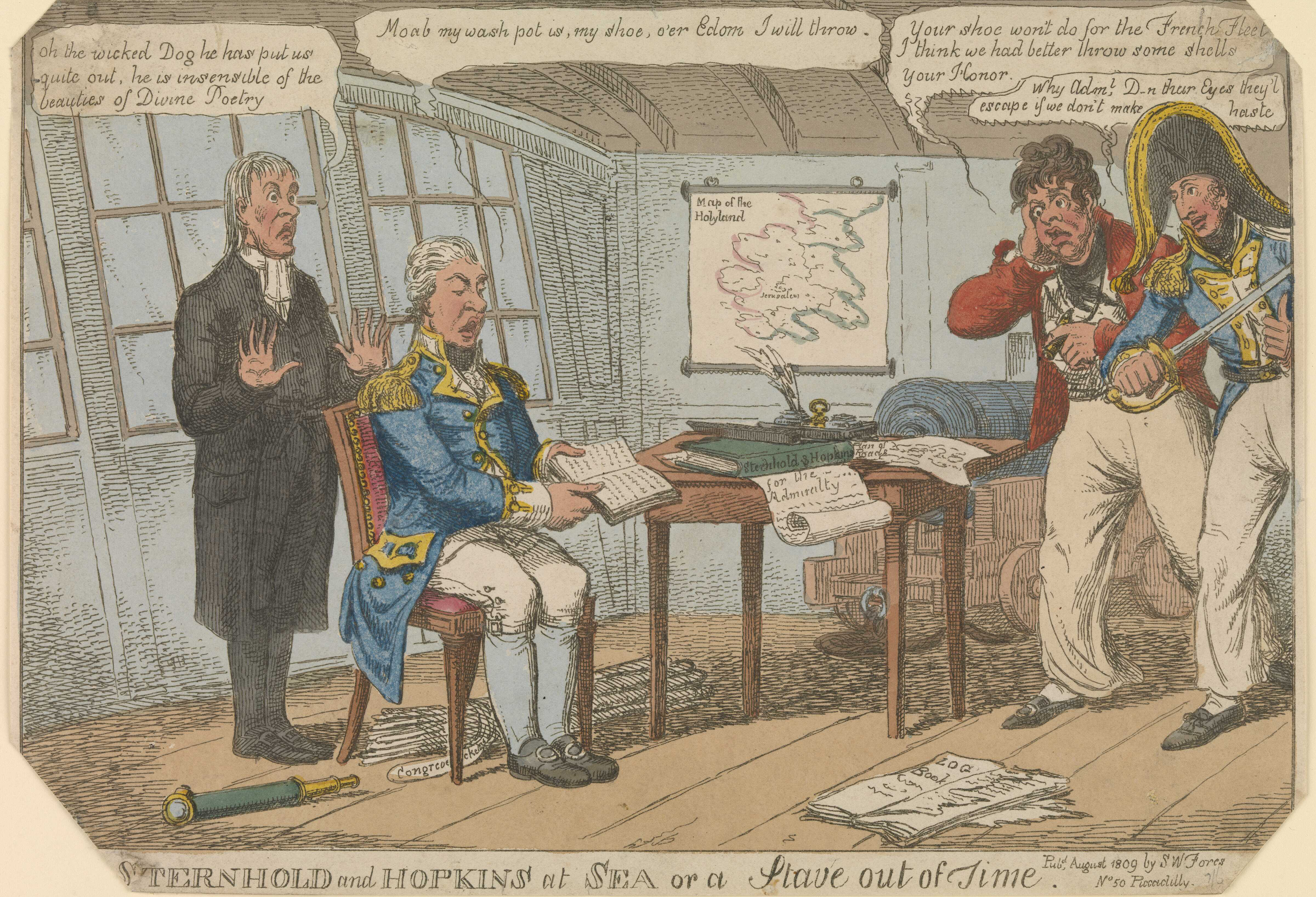
Cartoon showing Gambier reading the Bible while ignoring Cochrane's request to pursue the French fleet

The battle was undoubtedly a British victory; the French ships of the line Ville de Varsovie, Tonnere, Aquilon and Calcutta and frigate Indienne had been destroyed and much of the remaining ships of the Brest fleet were badly damaged and required extensive repairs, with Océan and Foudroyant being in a particularly poor state. French casualties in the engagement are not known for certain, but are estimated between 150–200 killed or wounded, while British suffered only 13 killed and 30 wounded. Allemand later wrote that most significant damage resulting from the battle was to the morale of the French navy; he wrote that "the greater part are disheartened; every day I hear them lamenting their situation, and speaking in praise of their enemy." Another French commentator told a British officer that the French navy "had now no security from the English in their harbours, and they expected we should next go into Brest and take out their fleet".

No British ship had suffered more than minor damage in almost two weeks of combat, and they could return to blockade duty with the knowledge that the Brest fleet was neutralised for a significant period time to come and confined to Rochefort, although a powerful squadron was still under construction there and the city's defences had been swiftly repaired. This was the last time during the Napoleonic Wars that a significant French fleet was able to put to sea from France's Atlantic ports; historian Richard Woodman describes it as the "biggest scare from a break-out French fleet in the post-Trafalgar period." Without naval support, the French West Indies were isolated, blockaded, invaded and captured by British forces in the years after the battle.

=== Courts-martial ===
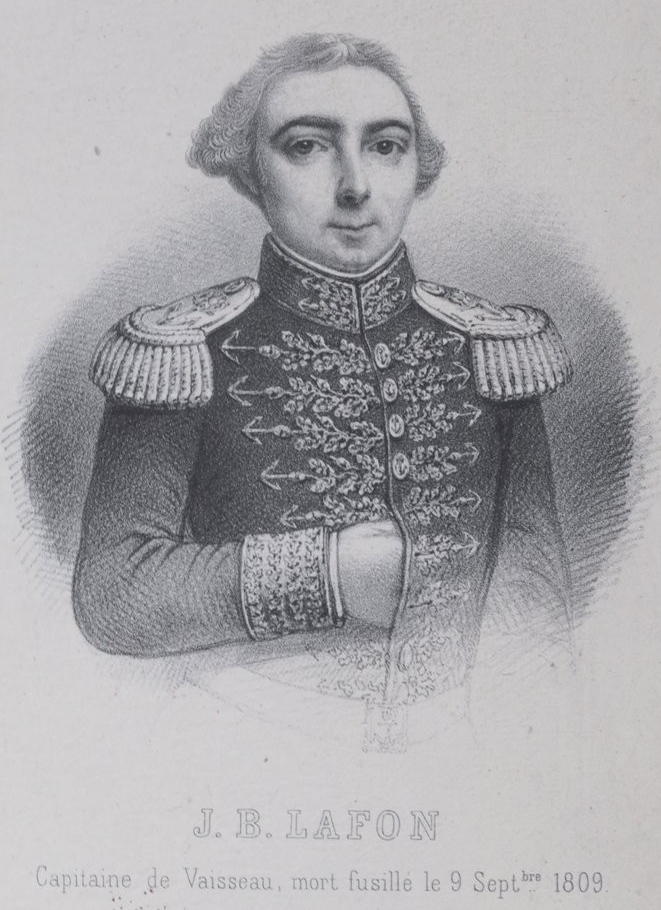
Jean-Baptiste Lafon, who was executed by firing squad after the battle

Almost as serious however were the legal ramifications of the battle. In both countries there was a storm of controversy; in France four captains faced courts-martial from 21 June on charges of having abandoned their ships too easily and failing to follow orders. The captain of Tonnerre was acquitted, the captain of Indienne was acquitted on the first charge but sentenced to three months' house arrest for the second and the captain of Tourville was sentenced to two years in prison and to be dismissed from the Navy for abandoning his ship prematurely. The captain of Calcutta, Jean-Baptiste Lafon, was convicted of abandoning his ship in the face of the enemy and sentenced to death on 8 September. The execution was carried out by firing squad on the deck of Océan the following day. Woodman considers that "these wretched officers paid the penalty for Willaumez's initial timidity." Allemand's defeat is often blamed on Napoleon's instructions before the battle, which mistakenly assumed that the Aix Roads were a safe anchorage.

In Britain, Cochrane arrived at Spithead on 21 April and news of the victory spread rapidly. The Times ran a dramatic account of the battle which presaged national celebrations, and the junior officers of the fleet engaged in the fireship attack were promoted, and presented with financial rewards, while James Wooldridge, captain of Mediator who had been terribly burned, was granted a gold medal and a presentation sword. In 1847 the Admiralty authorized the award of the Naval General Service Medal with clasp "Basque Roads 1809" to the 529 surviving claimants from the action.

Cochrane was initially celebrated for his achievement and made a Knight Companion of the Order of the Bath on 26 April. Shortly afterwards however he informed Lord Mulgrave that he intended to use his position as a member of parliament to oppose any effort to thank or reward Gambier for his part in the battle. Mulgrave immediately warned Gambier, who demanded a court-martial to investigate his behaviour. The court was convened on 26 July; the inquiry panel president was Admiral Sir Roger Curtis and his deputy was William Young, both friends of Gambier and political opponents of Cochrane. Over eight days witnesses were called and evidence presented, much of it misleading. Most seriously, the charts of Basque Roads supplied to the court had been drawn by officers from Gambier's ship and favoured Gambier's account of the action. Cochrane was questioned aggressively during his evidence and lost his temper, being repeatedly reprimanded. Ultimately Gambier was acquitted and awarded the thanks of Parliament, despite continuing determined opposition from Cochrane.

Gambier continued in command until 1811, and remained in service until his death in 1833. Cochrane was disgraced and refused further service, choosing semi-retirement to pursue his political ambitions. He was later implicated in the Great Stock Exchange Fraud of 1814, convicted and publicly disgraced. He resigned his commission and joined first the Chilean Navy and then the Brazilian Navy, before becoming commander of the Greek Navy during the Greek War of Independence. He was restored to the Royal Navy with a royal pardon in 1832 and died in 1860, shortly after publishing an autobiography which furiously castigated the participants in the events 51 years earlier.

=== Historical assessment ===
Blame for the French defeat has been apportioned between Allemand and Willaumez by historians. Willaumez's hesitation in February left the French in a precarious position, in particular his reluctance to attack the squadron under Beresford, victory over which might have granted his fleet access to the Atlantic. Allemand, having inherited this situation, compounded the problem by attempting to fortify his fleet's anchorage, inviting attack, rather than effect an escape or counter-attack. Once he determined to remain at anchor in Aix Roads, a British assault became inevitable.

In Britain, Gambier's conduct has been criticised by historians ever since the battle. For example, William Laird Clowes, wrote in 1901 that "there can be no question that affair of Aix Road was mismanaged by the Admiralty at home and by the Admiral on the spot" and that "a great naval commander never loses an occasion to attack when conditions are favourable to him." In 2007 historian Noel Mostert wrote "Oh Nelson! Nelson, Nelson, where were you? Never could the absence of the man from a scene of action clearly designed for his drive and decision have been more painfully alive." In the same year, David Cordingly wrote that "The boldness of the attack ... was comparable with the exploits of a Drake, de Ruyter and Nelson. And yet the action at Basque Roads has come to be regarded as a wasted opportunity, a bungled and confused affair." Perhaps the most damning response came from an enemy. Years later, Napoleon wrote to an English correspondent that Cochrane "could not only have destroyed [the French ships], ... but he might and would have taken them out, had your admiral supported him as he ought to have done ... The French admiral was a fool [imbécile], but yours was just as bad." However Richard Glover (1973) in Britain at Bay (George Allen and Unwin) is more nuanced and blames Cochrane for insubordination in what was a clear British victory. He notes Cochrane's career effectively ended.

== Notes ==
1. Note A: Harvey's conduct on this occasion destroyed his career. He not only threatened to resign the Navy if Cochrane was given command, but did so using "vehement and insulting language" within the hearing of other officers, telling Gambier that he "would go in with Tonnant, or any rotten old 74, to board the enemy's three-decked ship in Aix Road and bring her out". He went on to remark to Cochrane and other officers that "I am no canting Methodist, no hypocrite, nor a psalm-singer. I do not cheat old women out of their estates by hypocrisy and canting". On 22 May 1809 he faced a court-martial for this conduct, and although he apologised to the court and to Gambier personally and claimed he spoke only from "an excess of zeal for the service", he was dismissed from the Navy. He was reinstated the following year, but never held a command again.

== Bibliography ==
- Adkins, Roy & Lesley (2006). The War for All the Oceans. Abacus. ISBN 978-0-349-11916-8.
- Clowes, William Laird (1997) [1900]. The Royal Navy: A History from the Earliest Times to 1900. Vol. V. London: Chatham Publishing. ISBN 1-86176-014-0.
- Cochrane, Thomas (2000) [1860]. The Autobiography of a Seaman. London: Lyons Press. ISBN 1-58574-061-6.
- Cordingley, David (2007). Cochrane the Dauntless. London: Bloomsbury Publishing. ISBN 978-0-7475-8088-1.
- Harvey, Robert (2000). Cochrane: The Life and Exploits of a Fighting Captain. London: Constable. ISBN 1-84119-162-0.
- Henderson, James (1994) [1970]. The Frigates. Leo Cooper. ISBN 0-85052-432-6.
- James, William (2002) [1827]. The Naval History of Great Britain, Volume 5, 1808–1811. London: Conway Maritime Press. ISBN 0-85177-909-3. Edition of 1837 at the Internet Archive.
- Mostert, Noel (2007). The Line upon a Wind: The Greatest War Fought at Sea Under Sail 1793–1815. Vintage Books. ISBN 9-78071-260-9272.
- Tracy, Nicholas (1998). Who's Who in Nelson's Navy: 200 Naval Heroes. Chatham Publishing. ISBN 1-86176-244-5.
- Woodman, Richard (2001). The Sea Warriors. London: Constable Publishers. ISBN 1-84119-183-3.
