= French ship Ville de Varsovie =

Ship of the line of the French Navy

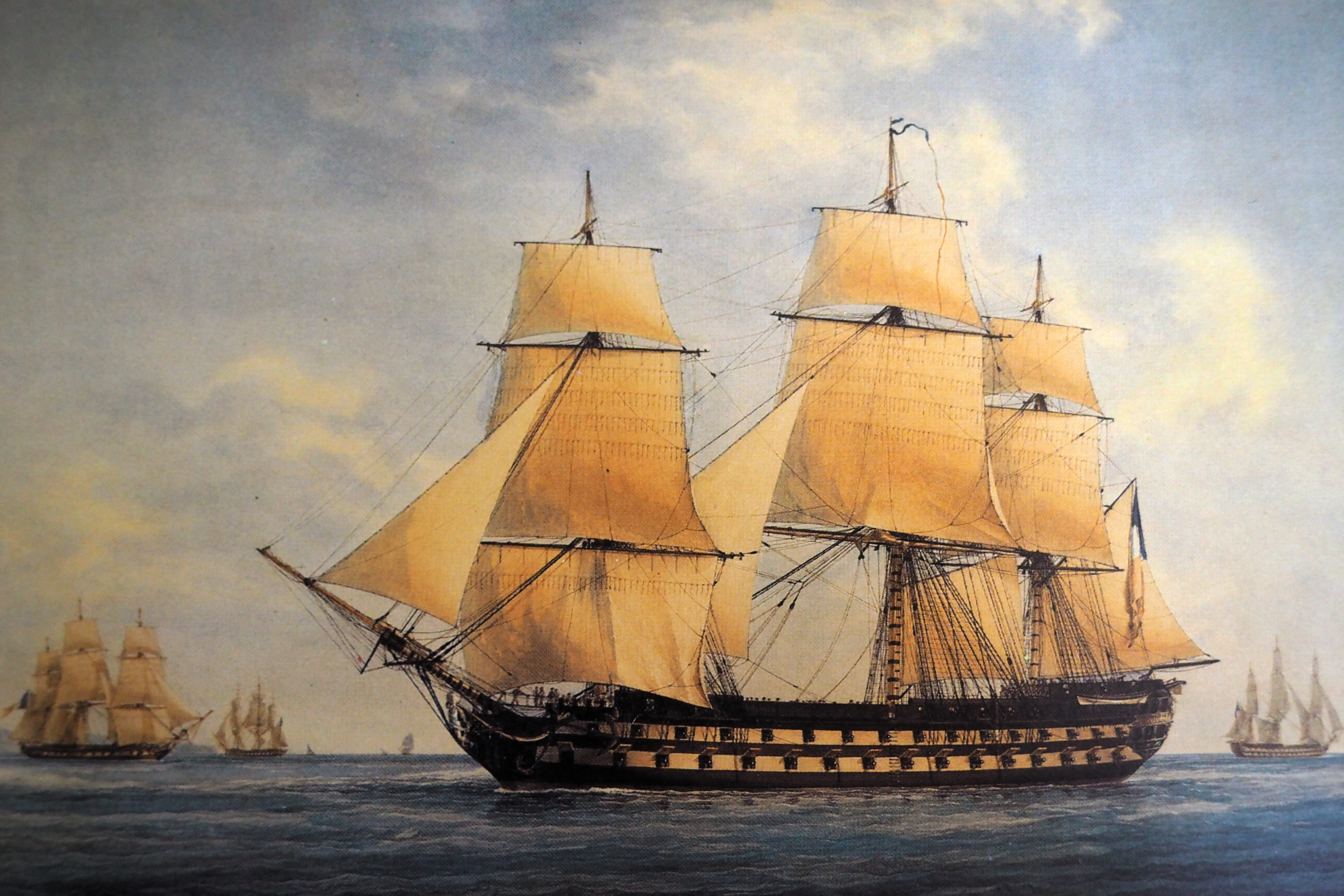
- Robuste, sister ship of Ville de Varsovie

History

France
- Name: Ville de Varsovie
- Namesake: Warsaw
- Ordered: 30 April 1804
- Builder: Arsenal de Rochefort
- Laid down: 22 March 1805
- Launched: 10 May 1808
- Commissioned: 18 June 1808
- Fate: Destroyed by fire on 13 April 1809

General characteristics
- Class & type: Bucentaure-class ship of the line
- Displacement: 3,868 tonneaux
- Tons burthen: 2,034 port tonneaux
- Length: 59.28 m (194 ft 6 in)
- Beam: 15.27 m (50 ft 1 in)
- Draught: 7.8 m (25 ft 7 in)
- Depth of hold: 7.64 m (25 ft 1 in)
- Sail plan: Full-rigged ship
- Crew: 866 (wartime)
- Armament: 80 guns: Lower gun deck: 30 × 36 pdr guns; Upper gun deck: 32 × 24 pdr guns; Forecastle and Quarterdeck: 14 × 12 pdr guns & 10 × 36 pdr carronades

Ville de Varsovie was a 3rd rank, 80-gun Bucentaure-class ship of the line built for the French Navy during the first decade of the 19th century, designed by Sané.

The ship was laid down at Arsenal de Rochefort in Rochefort, France, as Tonnant on 22 March 1805. In 1807, Napoleon Bonaparte established the Duchy of Warsaw and made a considerable effort to mobilize Polish national sentiment on France's behalf, and accordingly Tonnant was renamed Ville de Varsovie ("City of Warsaw") while still under construction. She was launched on 10 May 1808. Commissioned on 18 June 1808 under Captain Mahé, he became part of the Rochefort squadron.

In April 1809, Ville de Varsovie was part of the French Atlantic Fleet blockaded in Basque Roads at the mouth of the Charente on the Biscay coast of France by a Royal Navy squadron. On the afternoon of 12 April, during the Battle of Basque Roads, Ville de Varsovie was aground on rocks at low tide in Basque Roads near Charenton when British warships attacked. After two hours of pounding by the British fleet with little chance to fire back, Ville de Varsovie surrendered after her crew suffered about 100 casualties, and the British 74-gun third rate ship of the line HMS Revenge captured her. Although the leader of the British attack, Lord Thomas Cochrane, disapproved of the decision, the commanding officer of the 74-gun third rate ship of the line HMS Valiant, Captain John Bligh, deemed Ville de Varsovie beyond repair and set her afire during the night of 12–13 April 1809. The fire completed the destruction of Ville de Varsovie during the predawn hours of 13 April 1809.
