= École des applications militaires de l'énergie atomique =

Coordinates: 49.6685°N 1.6888°W

- Type: Military school
- Established: 1956
- Location: Cherbourg-en-Cotentin, France

The École des applications militaires de l'énergie atomique (EAMEA), also known as the Atomic School, is a military higher education establishment located in Cherbourg-en-Cotentin, which trains officers of the French Army and National Gendarmerie in nuclear science, technology and safety. EAMEA trains atomic engineers in the fields of naval propulsion and nuclear weapons.

The EAMEA also trains non-commissioned officers who are involved in radiological protection for the Ministry of the Armed Forces, particularly for the French Navy, personnel working on nuclear-powered vessels (such as nuclear-powered submarines, SSNs, SSBNs, and the nuclear-powered aircraft carrier), as well as personnel at support bases where the home ports for these nuclear-powered vessels are located. They are responsible for managing radiological surveillance of personnel in facilities storing spare naval equipment containing radionuclides, and ensuring radiological protection for maintenance personnel in these logistics and maintenance facilities that may operate in regulated access areas.

The EAMEA also trains agents from the French Ministry of the Interior.

The school trains around 900 students a year and employs 50 teachers and researchers.

It is part of the Normandy nuclear cluster, which includes the Flamanville nuclear power plant, the La Hague reprocessing plant and the Cherbourg arsenal, where Naval Group builds nuclear submarines.

== History ==
Established in 1956, the school was initially located in Paris and was supported by the Saclay Nuclear Studies Center.

In the 1950s, even though the French nuclear deterrence force didn't yet exist, French forces had the opportunity to practice handling nuclear weapons with American tactical weapons within the framework of NATO, using dual-key systems.

In September 1958, EAMEA relocated to Cherbourg, a submarine construction hub.

From 1958 to 1962, the school was under the command of Captain Henri Bellet. He successfully conducted the training of the first crews for the French nuclear deterrence force, as envisioned by General de Gaulle.

In 1959, EAMEA began admitting students from the Army and the Air Force for its fourth training cycle.

In 1961, the school was renamed the "Military School of Atomic Energy".

From September 23, 1964, to September 5, 1967, it was under the command of Captain Jean Guillou.

In 1971, the first French ballistic missile nuclear submarine (SLBM), the Redoutable, entered service.

In 1974, the school changed its name once again to adopt its current name.

Since 1998, the school has been under the supervision of the Directorate of Military Personnel of the Navy, which is itself under the authority of the Chief of Staff of the Navy. It is the only French military school that offers a diploma program at the third-cycle level of higher education, under the auspices of the National Institute for Nuclear Science and Technology (INSTN).
