= French ship Cassard (1803) =

Ship of the line of the French Navy

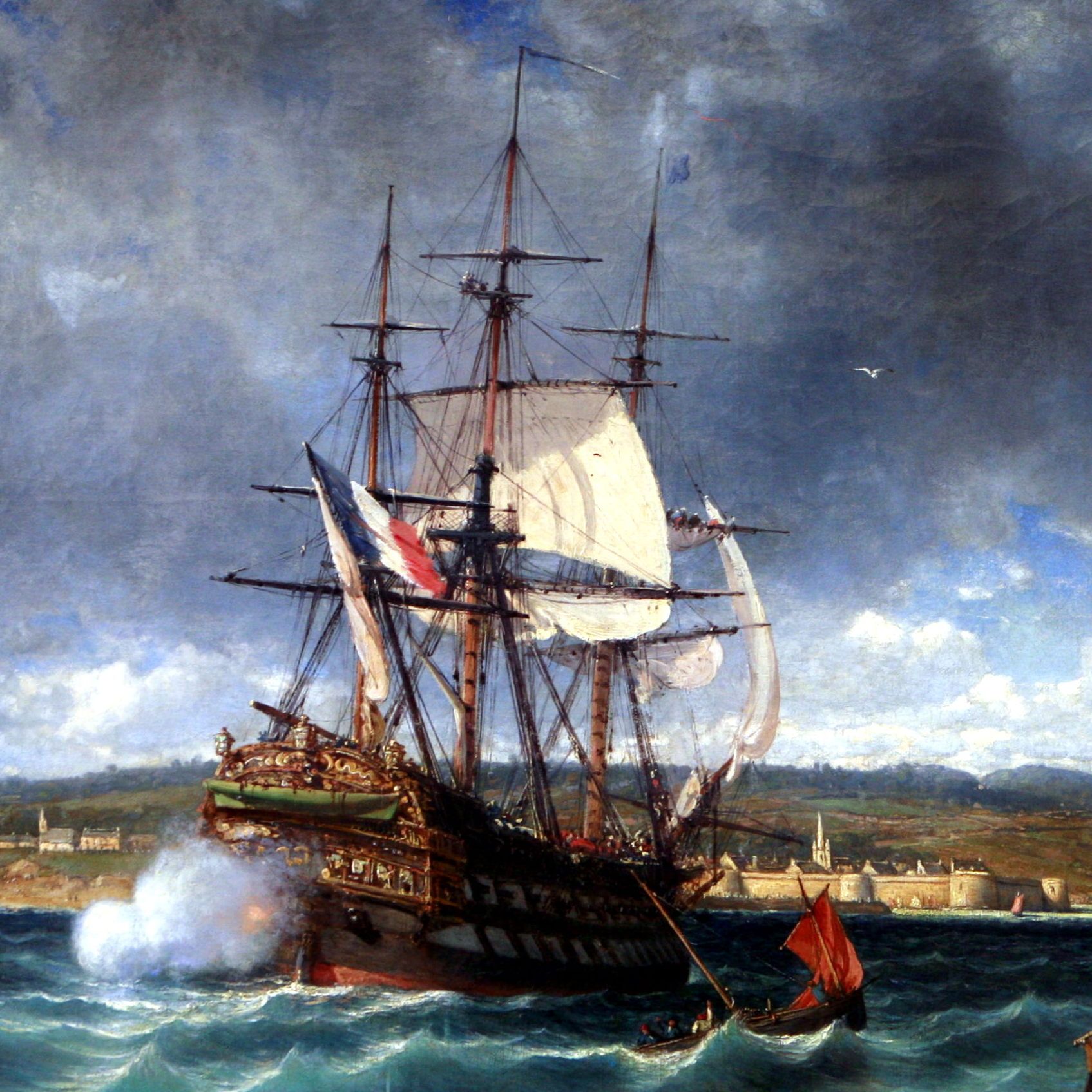
- Vétéran (sister-ship of Cassard) escaping into the shallow waters of Concarneau harbour. Painting by Michel Bouquet, on display at Brest Fine arts museum.

History

France
- Name: Cassard
- Namesake: Jacques Cassard
- Ordered: May 1795
- Builder: Brest
- Laid down: 26 August 1793
- Launched: 24 September 1803
- Completed: December 1803
- Commissioned: 16 February 1804
- Renamed: Glorieux, February 1798; Cassard, March 1798
- Stricken: 1815
- Fate: Broken up, 1832

General characteristics
- Class & type: Lengthened Téméraire-class ship of the line
- Displacement: 3,200 tonneaux
- Tons burthen: 1,600 port tonneaux
- Length: 56.47 m (185 ft 3 in)
- Beam: 14.73 m (48 ft 4 in)
- Draught: 7.47 m (24.5 ft)
- Depth of hold: 7.23 m (23 ft 9 in)
- Sail plan: Full-rigged ship
- Crew: 735
- Armament: 74 guns: Lower gun deck: 28 × 36 pdr guns; Upper gun deck: 30 × 24 pdr guns; Forecastle and Quarterdeck: 16 × 8 pdr guns; Poop deck: 4 × 36 pdr obusiers

Cassard was a 74-gun lengthened Téméraire-class ship of the line built for the French Navy during the 1790s, designed by Jacques-Noël Sané. Completed in 1804, she played a minor role in the Napoleonic Wars.

== Description ==
Cassard and her sister ship Vétéran were enlarged to carry an upper deck battery of 24-pounder long guns instead of the 18-pounders used on the standard ships of the Téméraire class. The two lengthened Téméraire-class ships had a length of 56.47 metres (185 ft 3 in), a beam of 14.73 metres (48 ft 4 in) and a depth of hold of 7.23 metres (23 ft 9 in). The ships displaced 3,200 tonneaux and had a mean draught of 7.47 metres (24 ft 6 in). They had a tonnage of 1,600 port tonneaux. Their crew numbered 735 officers and ratings during wartime. They were fitted with three masts and ship rigged.

The muzzle-loading, smoothbore armament of the Téméraire class consisted of twenty-eight 36-pounder long guns on the lower gun deck and thirty 24-pounder long guns on the upper gun deck. The armament on the quarterdeck and forecastle consisted of a total of sixteen 8-pounder long guns. On the poop deck (dunette) were four 36-pounder obusiers. The 24-pounders were satisfactory, but the ships nevertheless reverted to their previous 18-pounders around 1806. At the same time the obusiers were removed and the armament of the forecastle and quarterdeck revised to consist of a total of fourteen 8-pounders and fourteen 36-pounder carronades.

== Construction and career ==
Cassard was laid down on 26 August 1793 at the Arsenal de Brest and named Lion in mid-1794. On 24 February 1798, she was renamed to Glorieux, and then to Cassard on 4 March. The ship was launched on 24 September 1803 and completed in December. The ship was commissioned on 16 February 1804. Under Commodore Gilbert-Amable Faure, Cassard took part in the Atlantic campaign of 1806 in Willaumez' squadron, taking two prizes on the way. In August, the 1806 Great Coastal hurricane caused her to separate from the rest of the fleet; she returned to Brest on 13 October. The ship took part in Willaumez' attempt to rescue blockaded ships from Lorient and anchored in Rochefort, where she took part in the Battle of the Basque Roads in April 1809. During the battle, she attempted to escape into Rochefort harbour, ran aground, and was refloated by throwing part of her guns overboard. Unable to break through the British blockade, Cassard was decommissioned in Rochefort. She was condemned in May 1818, and used as a coal hulk in Rochefort, before being broken up in 1832.
