= Antoine Louis de Gourdon =

French naval officer (1765–1883)

Antoine-Louis de Gourdon
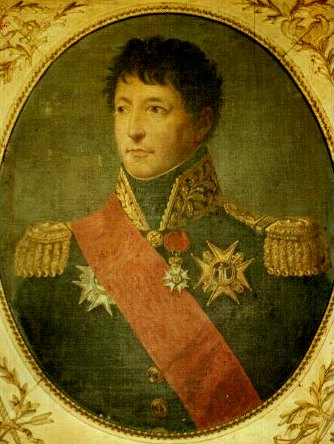
- Born: 20 July 1765; Paris, France
- Died: 28 July 1833 (aged 68); Paris, France
- Military career
- Allegiance: First French Empire; Kingdom of France
- Rank: Vice-amiral
- Conflicts: Saint-Domingue expedition; Napoleonic Wars; Battle of Basque Roads
- Awards: Grand Officier of the Legion of Honour; Grand Cross of the Order of Saint Louis

Antoine Louis Gourdon, born in Paris on 20 July 1765 and died there on 28 June 1833, was a vice-admiral of the French Navy.

== Life ==
He saw his first campaign in the frigate Aimable, taking part in the capture of Demerara. Unlike many officers he did not join the French Royalist cause, and was dismissed in 1793. Later restored to the Navy, he served with the Saint-Domingue expedition, commanding the naval division at Port-de-Paix.

He later took part, in April 1809, at the Battle of Basque Roads, on board Foudroyant. In 1811 he took command of the French squadron based in the Scheldt, defending the river from British attack during the Siege of Antwerp in 1814.

After the fall of Emperor Napoleon, he joined the Bourbon Restoration. From 1815, he successfully commanded the fleet at Rochefort, and that at Brest between 1816 and 1826. In 1822, he was promoted to vice-amiral and became a member of the conseil d'Amirauté. In 1829, he became directeur général of the Dépôt des cartes et plans de la Marine, the French naval cartography department.

He was made a Chevalier (February 1804), Officier (June 1804), Commandeur (July 1814) and Grand Officier (August 1820) of the national order of the Légion d’honneur as well as a Chevalier (July 1814), Commandeur (May 1816) and Grand Croix (August 1824) of the Ordre de Saint-Louis.

He died on 28 June 1833 and was buried in the 39th division of the Cimetière du Père-Lachaise in Paris.

== Bibliography ==
- Mullié, Charles (1852). "^{article name needed}" . Biographie des célébrités militaires des armées de terre et de mer de 1789 à 1850 (in French). Paris: Poignavant et Compagnie.
- Olivier Chapuis, À la mer comme au ciel. Beautemps-Beaupré et la naissance de l'hydrographie moderne (1700-1850), Presses de l'Université Paris-Sorbonne, 1999, 1060 pages.
- Étienne Taillemite, Dictionnaire des Marins français, Paris, Tallandier, 2002.

== Notes ==
- This article is based on a translation of an article from the French Wikipedia.
