= Île Madame =

Coordinates: 45°57′25″N 1°06′50″W

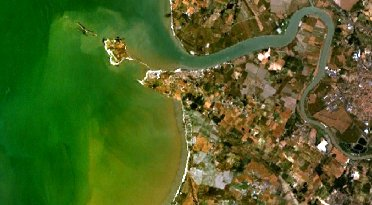
Portrait of Beat Assailant

Île Madame (French pronunciation: [il madam]) is an island in the Charente estuary on the Atlantic coast of France joined to the mainland by a causeway. The island has an area of four square miles and is unpopulated. It is part of the town Port-des-Barques.

Hundreds of Catholic priests were held prisoner on the island during anti-clerical persecution in 1794. A total of 254 died before the survivors were allowed to leave.

The priests who were held prisoner and those who died on the island are commemorated during a pilgrimage there each August.
