= French ship Océan (1790) =

Ship of the line of the French Navy

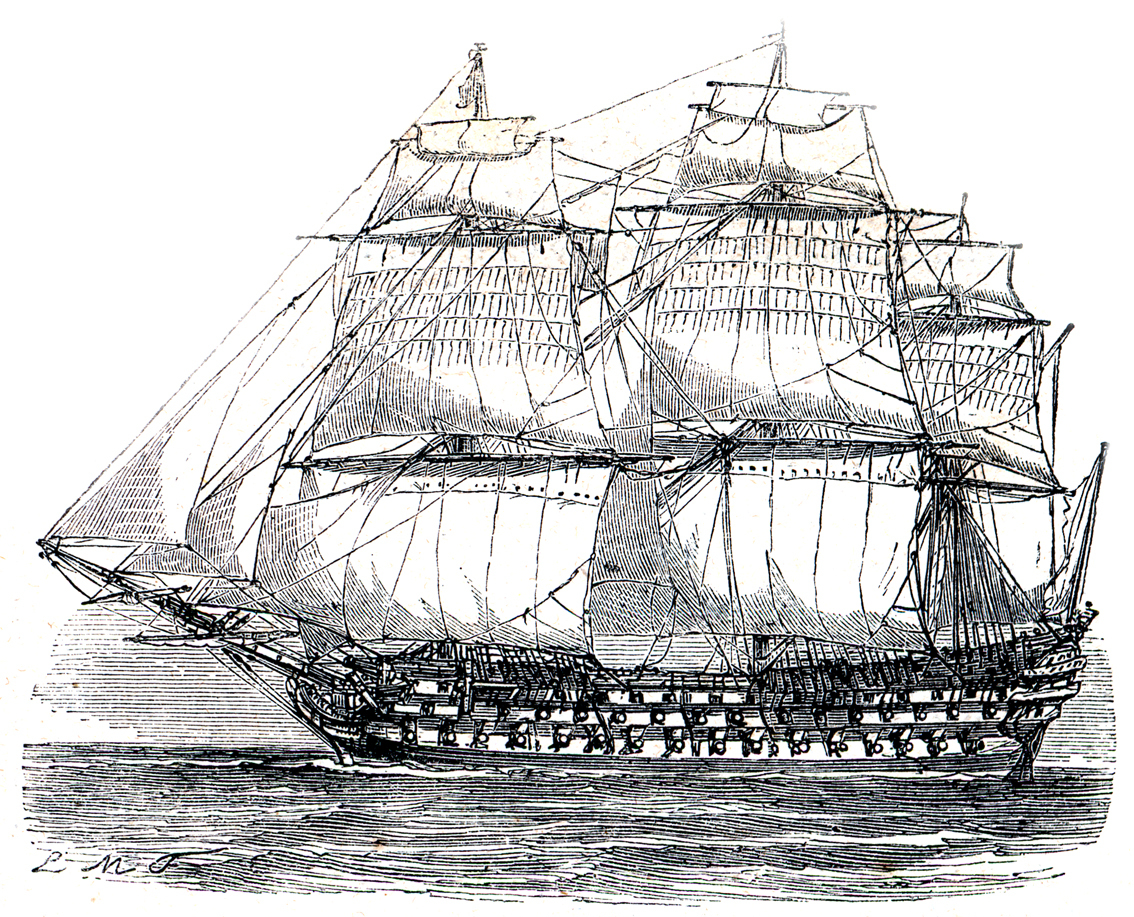
- Illustration of Océan by Antoine Léon Morel-Fatio

History

France
- Namesake: Ocean
- Ordered: 30 September 1785
- Builder: Arsenal de Toulon
- Laid down: 12 August 1786 as États de Bourgogne
- Launched: 8 November 1790
- Out of service: 2 August 1850
- Renamed: Ordered and completed as États de Bourgogne; Côte d'Or 22 January 1793; Montagne 22 October 1793; Peuple 25 May 1795; Océan 30 May 1795.
- Stricken: 1851 floating battery, 1855/56 broken up
- Fate: Broken up in 1856

General characteristics
- Class & type: Océan-class ship of the line
- Displacement: 5,095 tonneaux
- Tons burthen: 2,794–2,930 port tonneaux
- Length: 65.18 m (213.8 ft) (196.6 French feet)
- Beam: 16.24 m (53.3 ft) (50 French feet)
- Draught: 8.12 m (26.6 ft) (25 French feet)
- Propulsion: sail, 3,265 m^{2} (35,140 sq ft)
- Complement: 1,079
- Armament: Lower deck: lower deck: 32 36-pounder guns; middle deck: 34 24-pounder guns; upper deck: 34 12-pounder guns; forecastle: 18 8-pounder guns, 6 36-pounder carronades

Océan was a 118-gun first-rate three-decker ship of the line of the French Navy, lead ship (Note: Commerce de Marseille was ordered after États de Bourgogne (which was later renamed Océan), but launched before her; therefore, the ship type is alternatively called Commerce de Marseille class or Océan class) of her class. She was funded by a don des vaisseaux donation from the Estates of Bourgogne.

She was ordered as États de Bourgogne and was launched at Brest in 1790. Like many French ships of the line during the Revolutionary period, she was renamed several times, becoming Côte d'Or in January 1793, Montagne in October 1793, Peuple on 17 May 1795, and a matter of weeks later again renamed, to Océan. She served until 1855.

A large model of a generic Océan-class ship, named Océan, at the 1/16 scale can be seen at the Musée de la Marine in Paris.

== Career ==
Figurehead of Océan.

As the largest ship of the line in the Brest fleet, the ship spent much of her early career as the fleet flagship.

As Montagne, the ship was the flagship of Counter-admiral Louis Thomas Villaret de Joyeuse at the Glorious First of June on 1 June 1794. She was badly damaged by HMS Royal Sovereign, losing 313 men and receiving 233 round shots in her hull.

On 17 May 1795, she was renamed Peuple; a month later, on 23 June she fought in the Battle of Groix as Villaret's flagship. Returning to Lorient three days later, she was officially renamed to Océan, a name that had been in use since 30 May.

She was refitted in Brest in 1797.

In 1801, she once again served as Villaret's flagship, ferrying troops of Leclerc's expedition to Saint-Domingue.

Océan was Allemand's flagship at the Battle of the Basque Roads.

She was decommissioned on 2 August 1850, and used as a floating artillery battery from May 1851.

Views of Océan
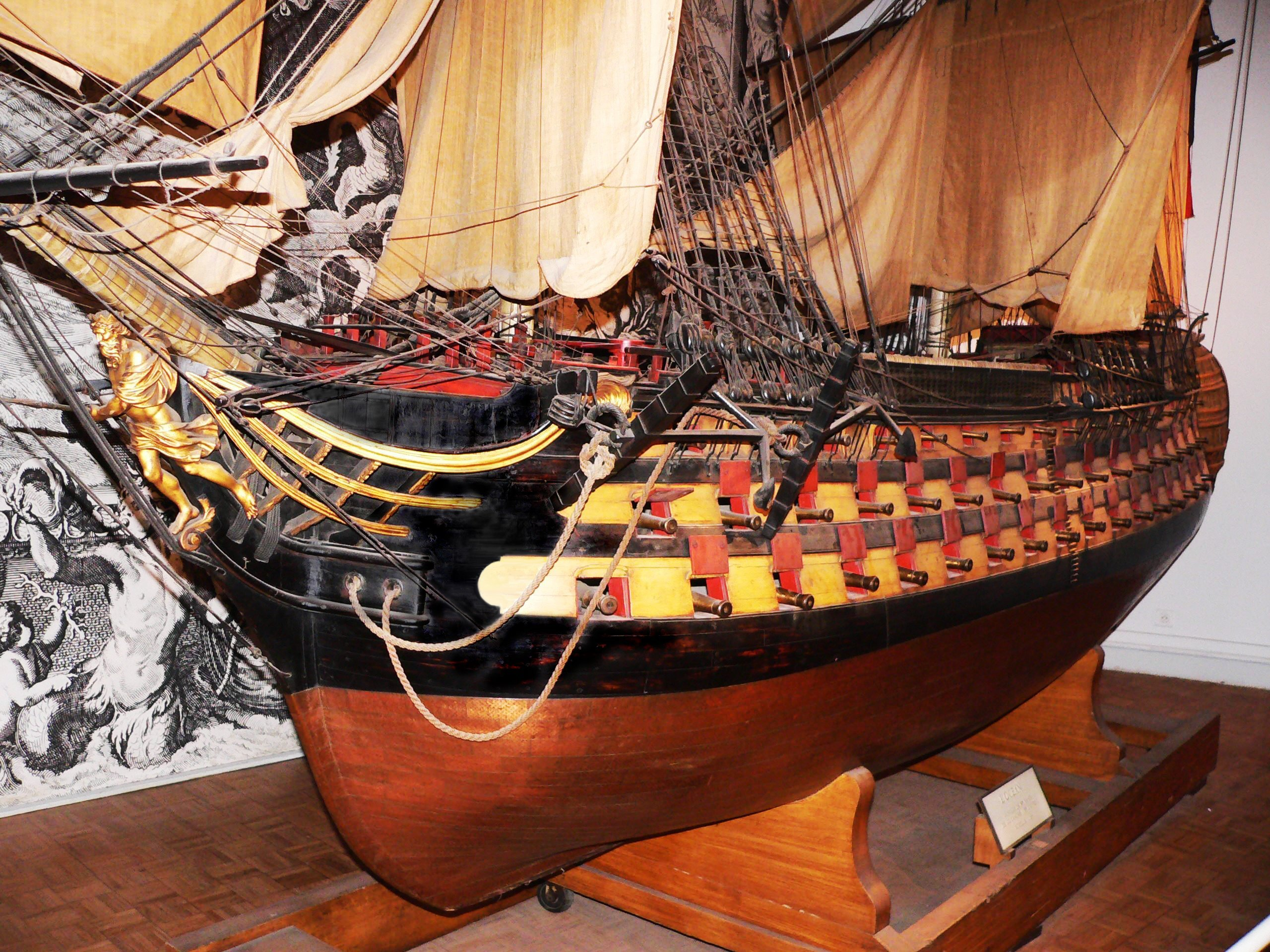
Large model of a generic Océan-class ship, named Océan

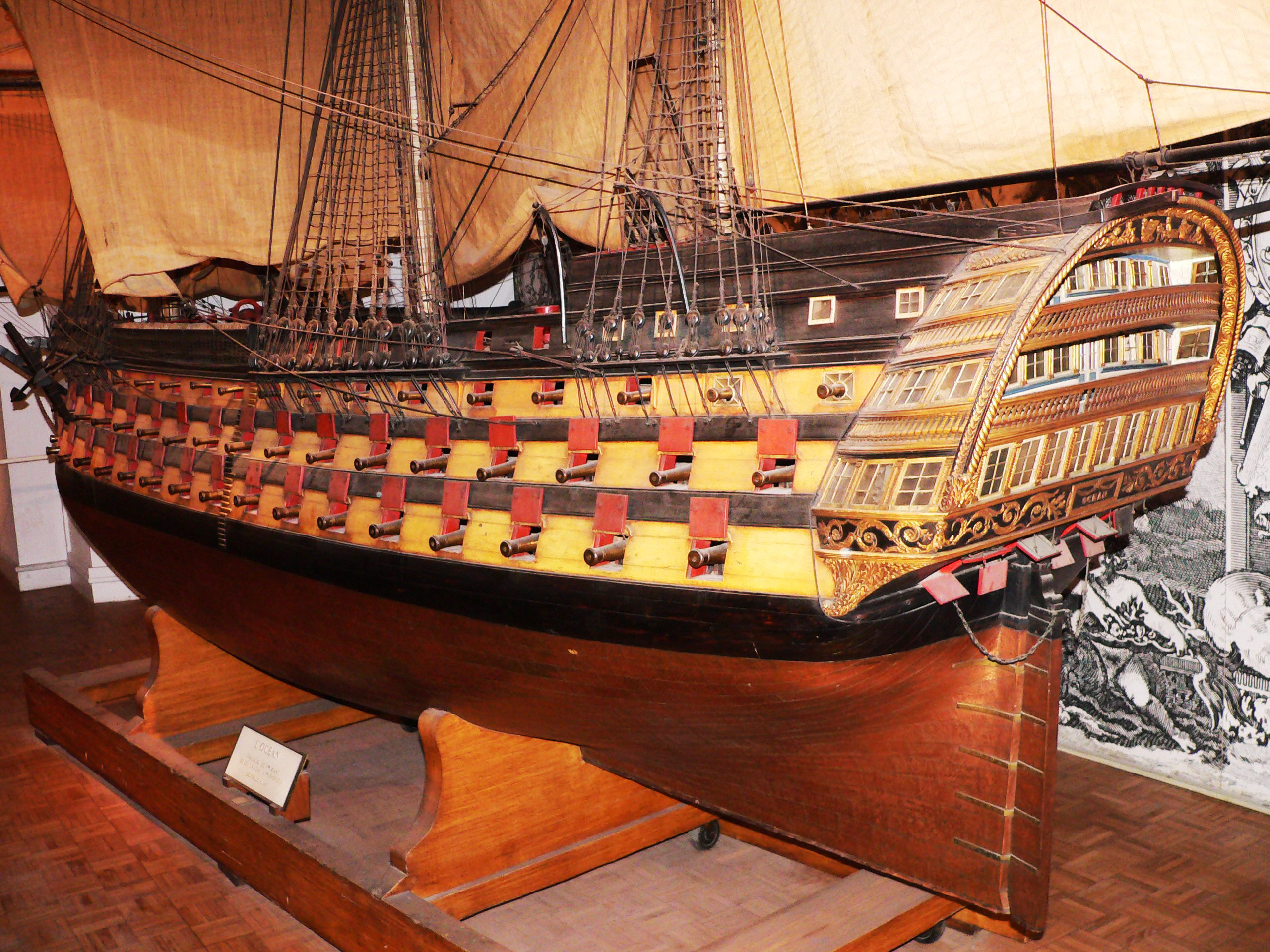

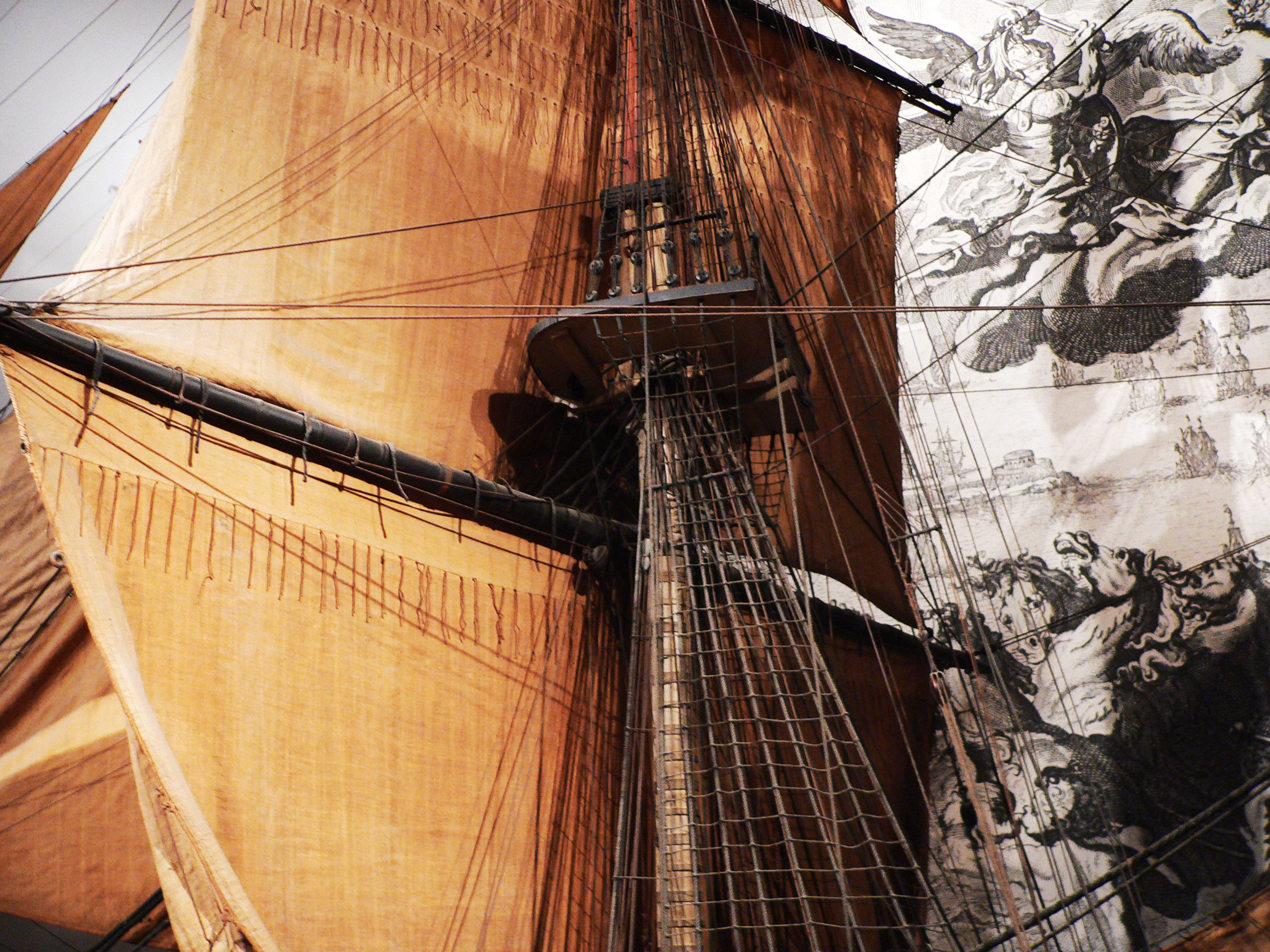

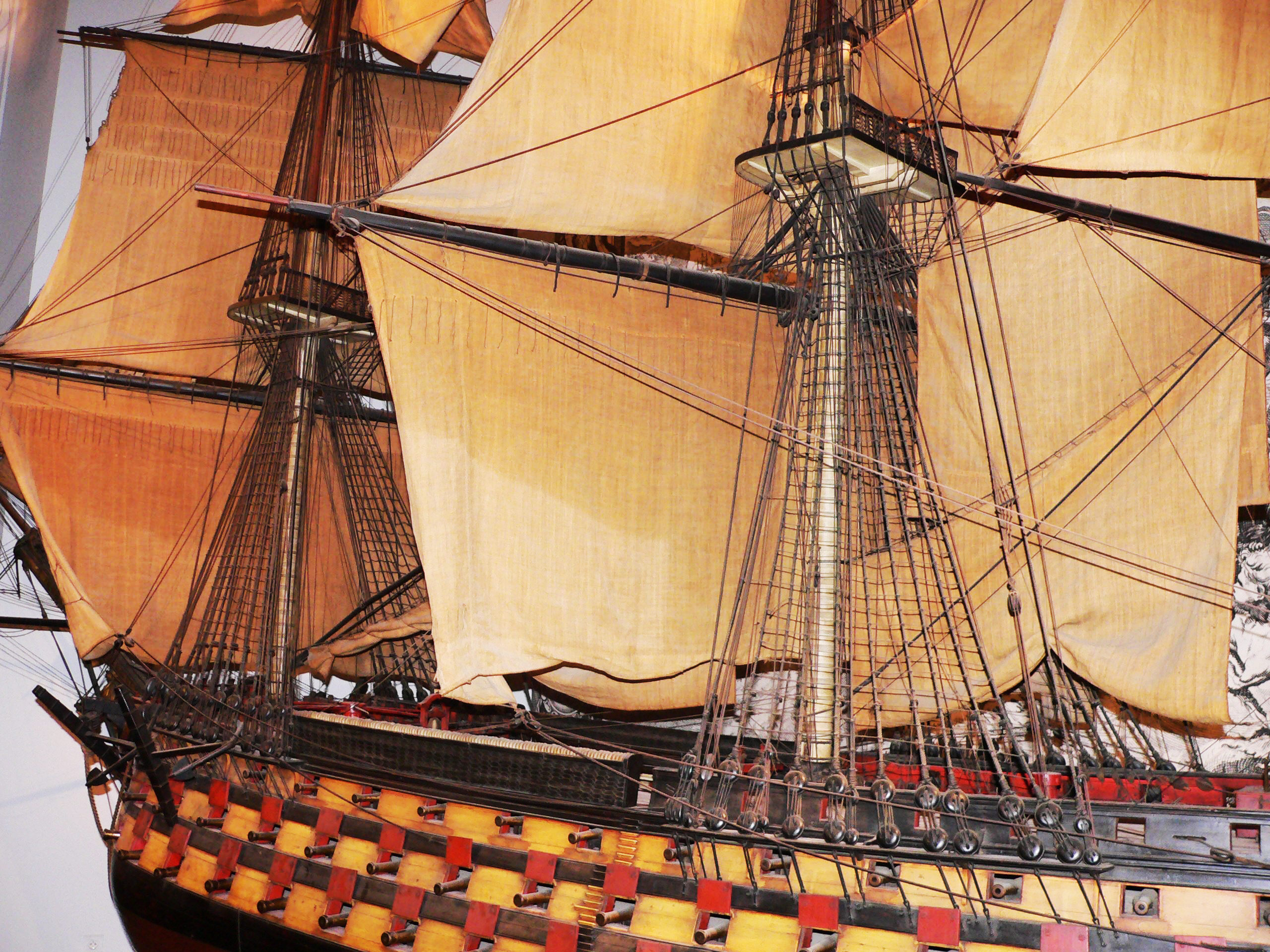

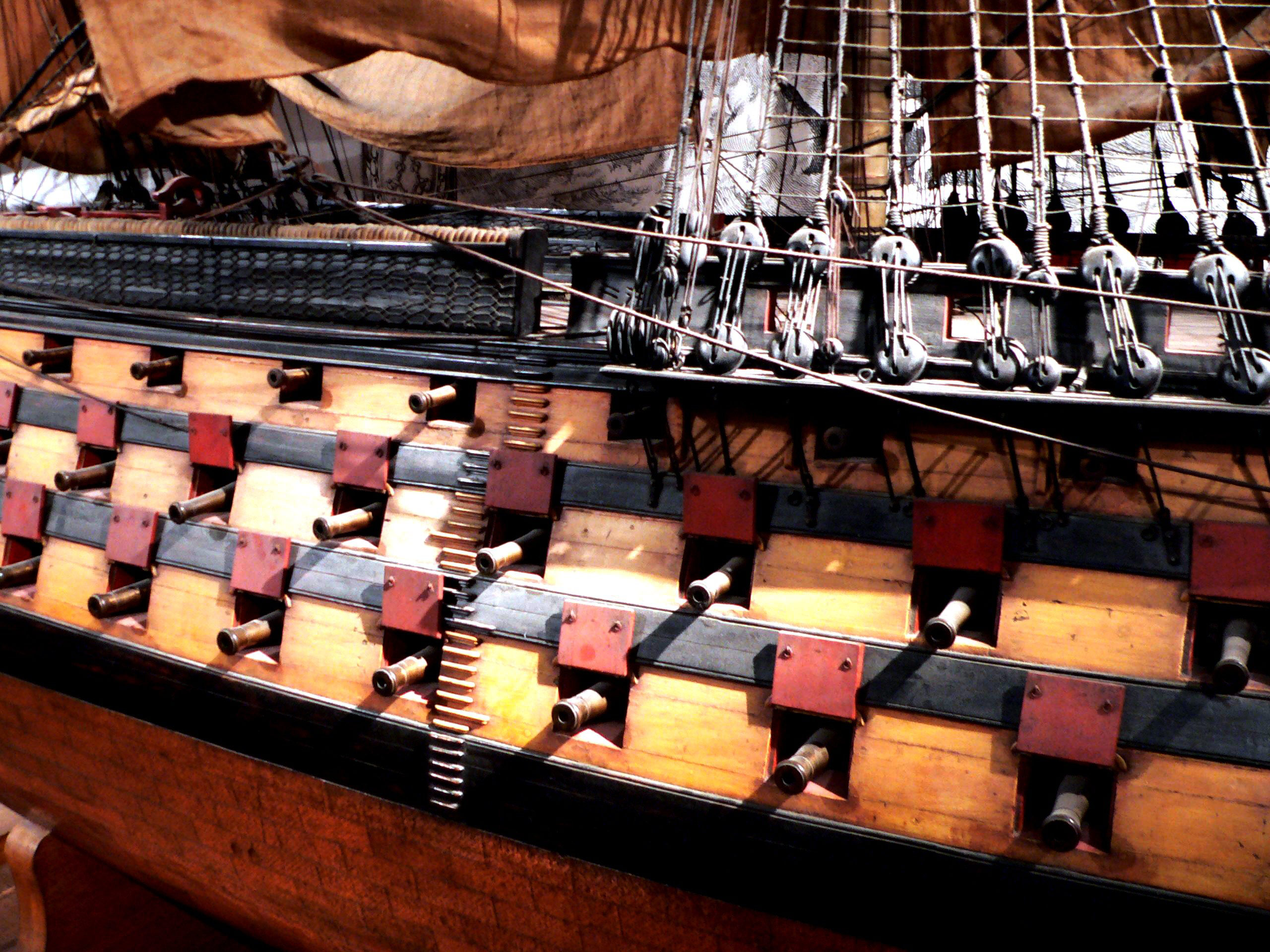

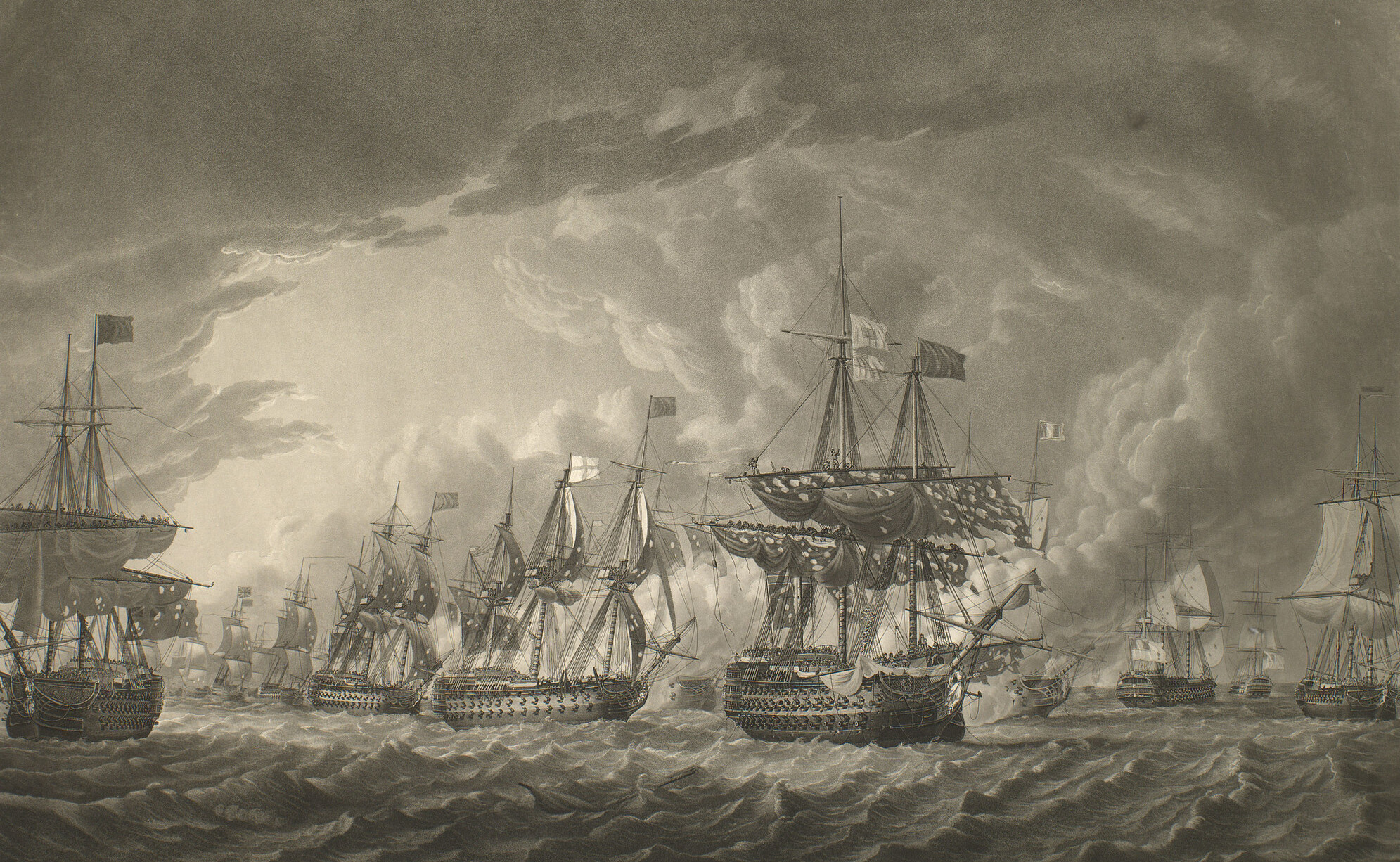
Montagne (shown) in the preliminary action which led, two days later, to the engagement known as 'Battle of the Glorious First of June

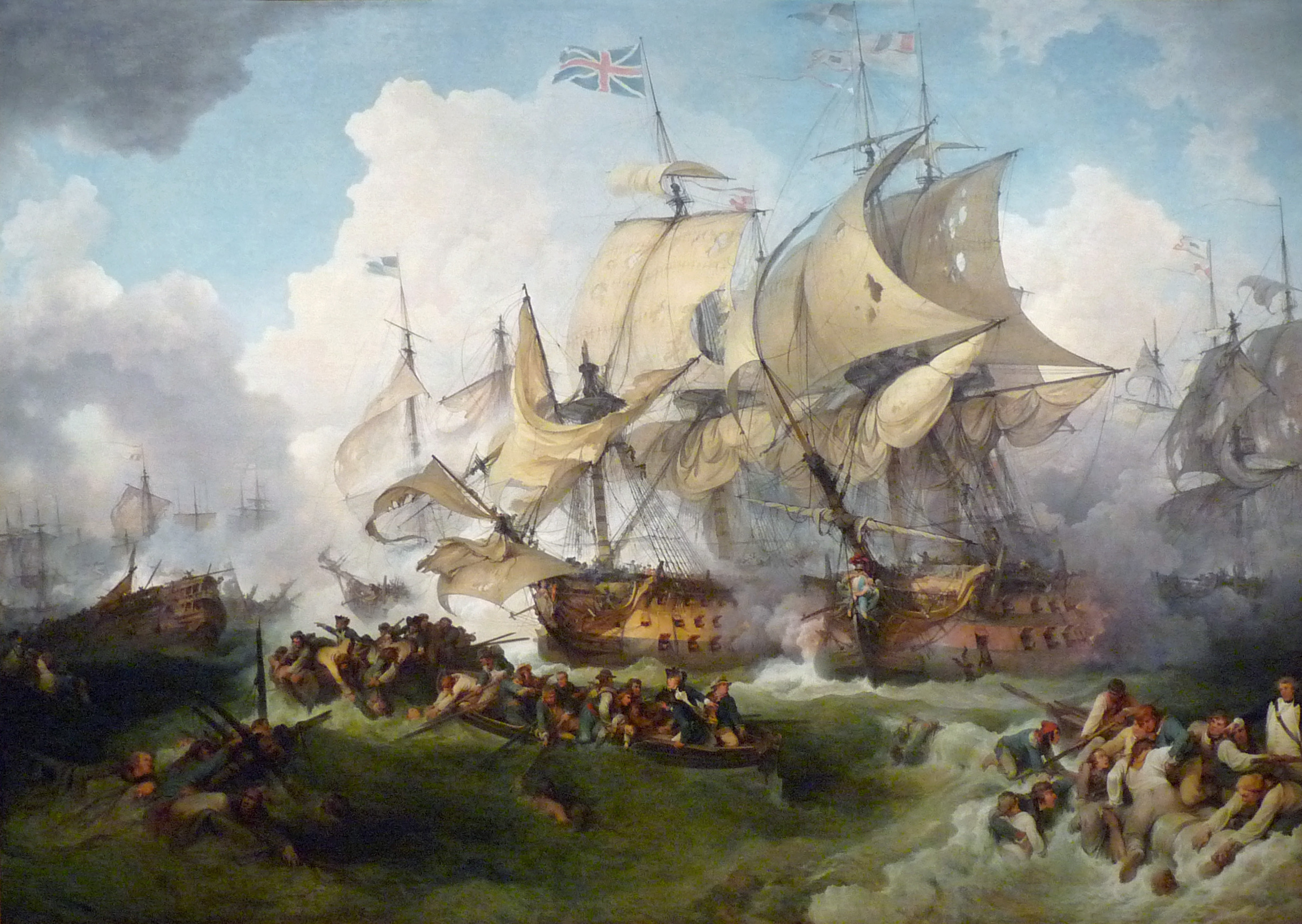
Océan, as Montagne, in Loutherbourg's painting Lord Howe's action, or the Glorious First of June
