= Basque Roads =

Sheltered bay off the coast of France

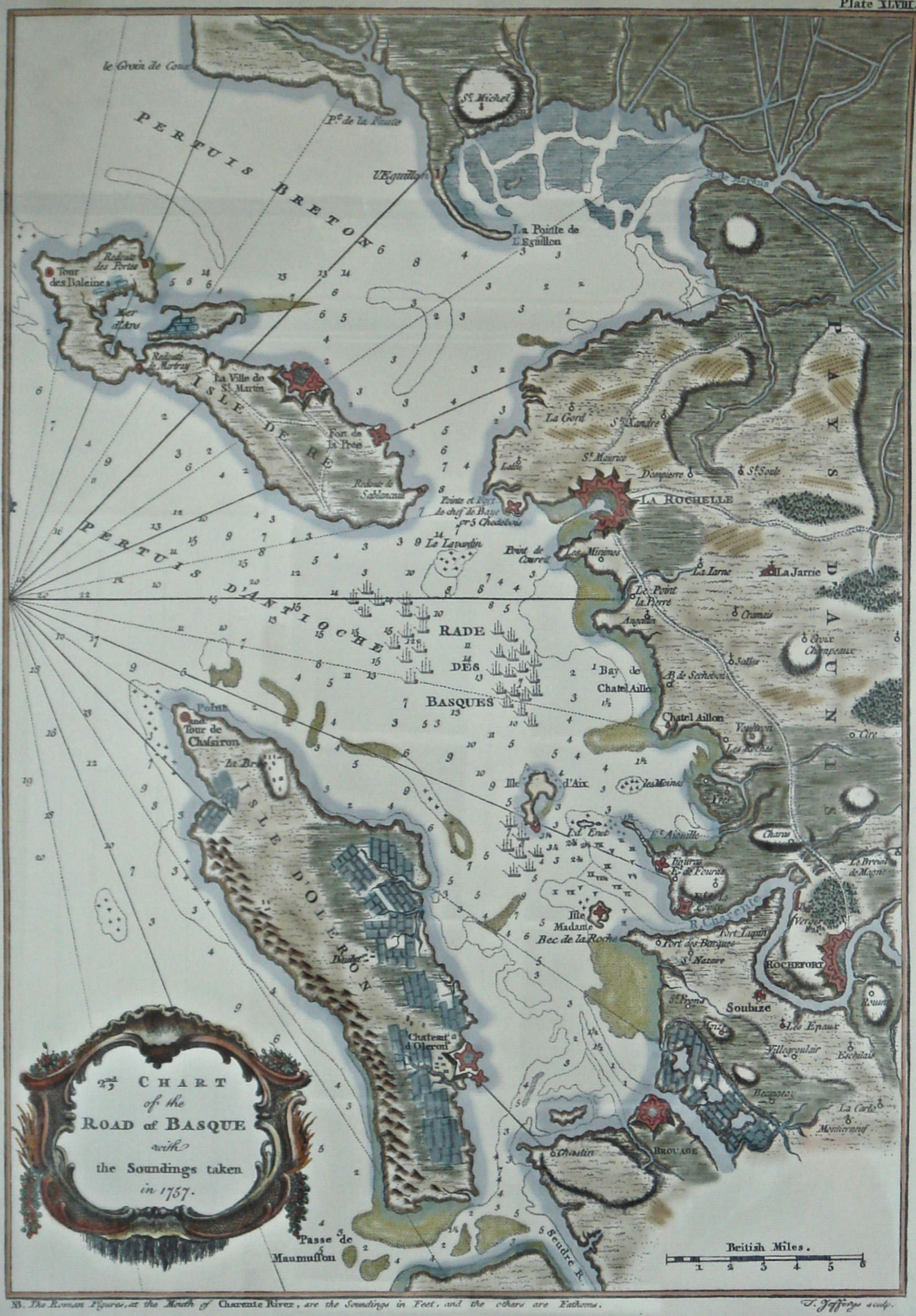
- British chart of the Basque Roads, 1757

- Location within France Location within Nouvelle-Aquitaine
- Location: Bay of Biscay, Atlantic Ocean
- Coordinates: 46°2′31.2″N 1°12′32.4″W
- Type: roadstead
- Basin countries: France

Basque Roads, sometimes referred to as Aix Roads, is a roadstead (a sheltered bay) on the Biscay shore of the Charente-Maritime département of France, bounded by the Île d'Oléron to the west and the Île de Ré to the north. The port of La Rochelle stands at the northeast corner of the roads, and the town of Rochefort is near the mouth of the river Charente to the south.

It was the location of a failed British attack on Rochefort in 1757 during the Seven Years' War, of an attack by HMS Unicorn and HMS St Fiorenzo on a Spanish squadron on 2 July 1799, and of the final surrender of Napoleon Bonaparte on HMS Bellerophon on 15 July 1815. It was also the site of the British naval victory over a French fleet at the 1809 Battle of Basque Roads.

A further engagement took place on 13 February 1810, when Lieutenant Gardiner Henry Guion was put in command of eight boats from HMS Christian VII under Sir Joseph Sydney Yorke, HMS Armide under Captain Lucius Ferdinand Hardyman, and HMS Seine under Captain David Atkins, to attack nine French gun-boats in the Basque Roads, capturing one.

== See also ==
- roadstead in wiktionary
