= French ship Souverain =

A number of ships of the French Navy have borne the name Souverain ("Sovereign"). Among them:

- French ship Souverain (1757), a 74-gun ship of the line, lead ship of her class. She was renamed Peuple souverain during the French Revolution.
- French ship Souverain (1819), a 120-gun Océan-class ship of the line
