= French ship Inflexible =

Six ships of the French Navy have borne the name Inflexible ("Unyielding"):

== Ships ==
- Inflexible (1752), a 64-gun Hardi-class ship of the line
- Golymin (1809), a 74-gun Téméraire-class ship of the line, was initially to be named Inflexible.
- Roi-de-Rome (1816), a 116-gun Océan-class ship of the line, was named Inflexible at some point. She was never launched.
- Friedland (1840), a 116-gun Océan-class ship of the line, was ordered as Inflexible and renamed several times while on keel before being eventually launched as Friedland.
- Inflexible (1840), a 90-gun Suffren-class ship of the line
- Inflexible (S615), a Redoutable-class ballistic submarine.
Ships of the French Navy named Inflexible
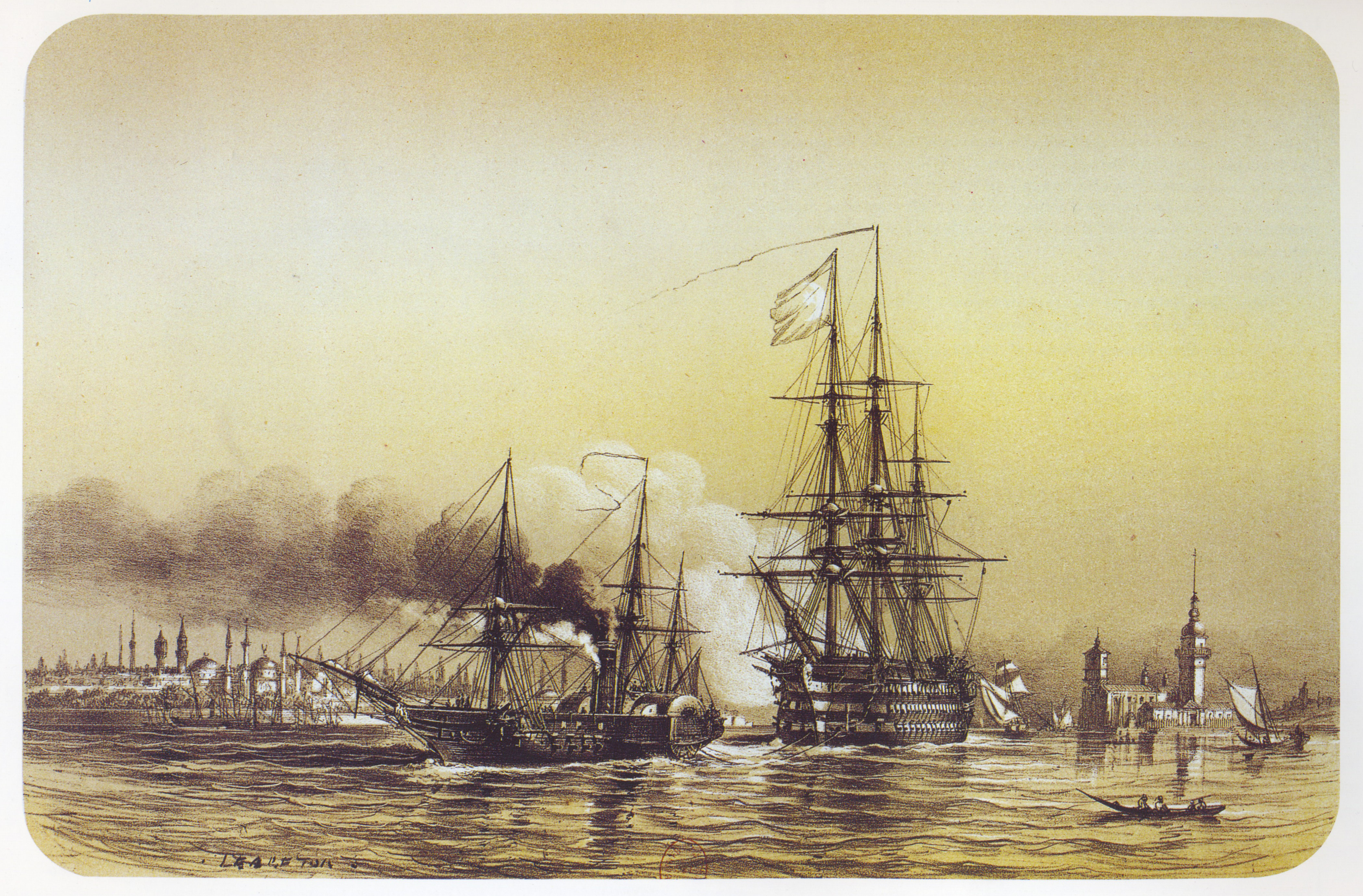
Friedland (1840)

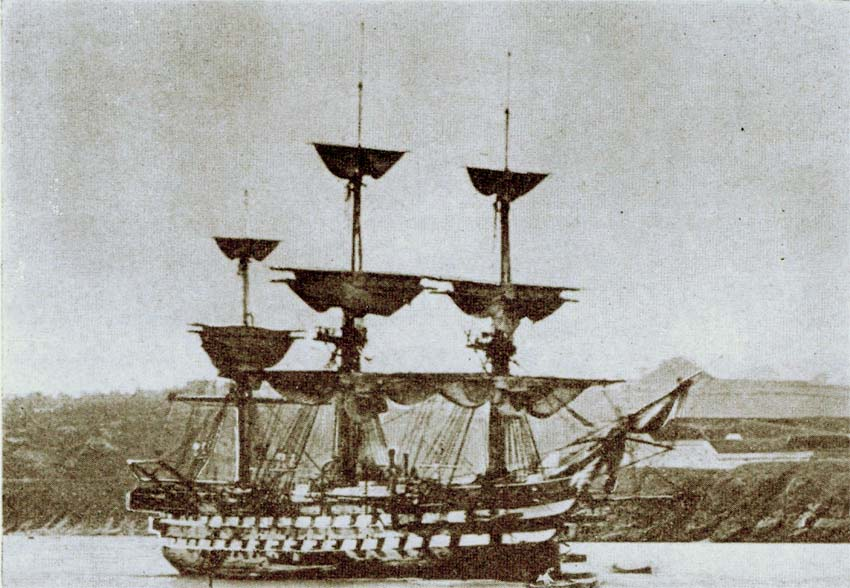
Inflexible (1840) as gunnery school

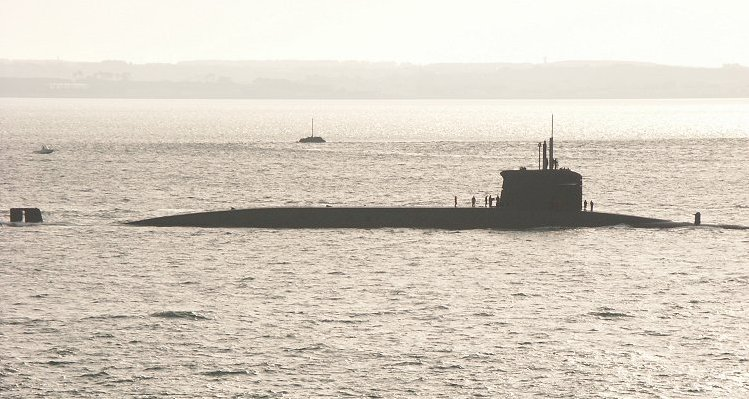
Inflexible (S615)

== See also ==
- HMS Inflexible

== Notes and references ==
=== Bibliography ===
- Roche, Jean-Michel (2005). Dictionnaire des bâtiments de la flotte de guerre française de Colbert à nos jours. Vol. 1. Group Retozel-Maury Millau. pp. 372–373. ISBN 978-2-9525917-0-6. OCLC 165892922.
- Roche, Jean-Michel (2005). Dictionnaire des bâtiments de la flotte de guerre française de Colbert à nos jours. Vol. 2. Group Retozel-Maury Millau. p. 250. ISBN 978-2-9525917-0-6. OCLC 165892922.
