= French ship Austerlitz =

At least two ships of the French Navy have been named Austerlitz:

- French ship Austerlitz (1808) an Océan-class ship of the line launched in 1808 and broken up in 1837
- French ship Austerlitz (1852) a Hercule-class ship of the line launched in 1852 and broken up in 1895
