= French ship Roi-de-Rome =

Ship of the line of the French Navy

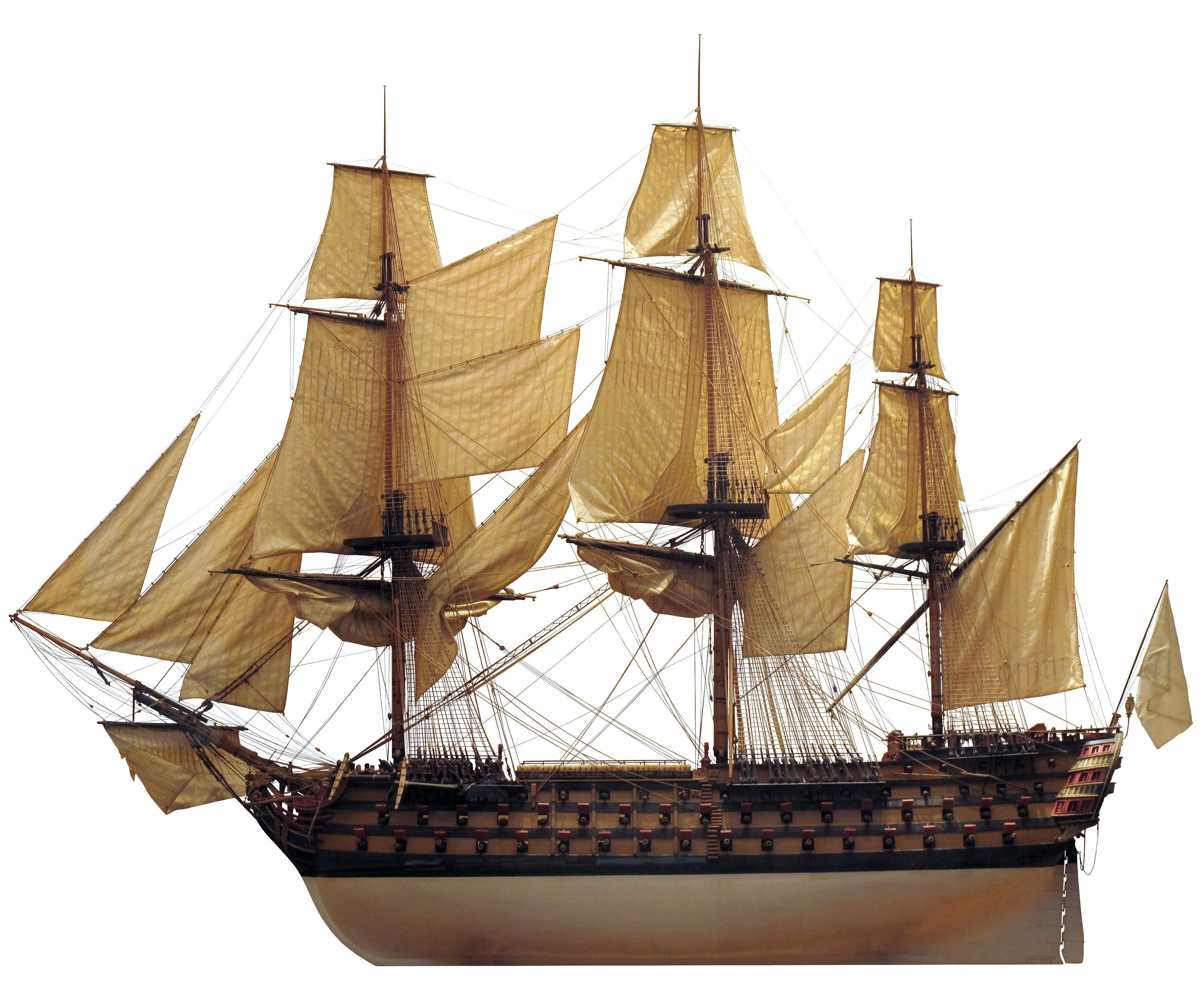
- Model of Commerce de Marseille, Roi-de-Rome's sister ship

History

France
- Name: Roi de Rome
- Fate: Broken up incomplete, 1816

General characteristics
- Class & type: Océan-class ship of the line
- Displacement: 5098 tonneaux
- Tons burthen: 2,794–2,930 port tonneaux
- Length: 63.83 m (209 ft 5 in) (gun deck)
- Beam: 16.24 m (53 ft 3 in)
- Draught: 8.15 m (26 ft 9 in)
- Depth of hold: 8.12 m (26 ft 8 in)
- Propulsion: sail, 3,250 m^{2} (35,000 sq ft)
- Sail plan: full-rigged ship
- Complement: 1,117
- Armament: Lower gun deck:: 32 × 36 pdr guns; Middle gun deck: 34 × 24 pdr guns; Upper gun deck: 34 × 12 pdr guns; Forecastle & quarterdeck: 18 × 8 pdr guns + 6 × 36 pdr obusiers

Roi de Rome (King of Rome) was a first-rate 118-gun Océan-class ship of the line built for the French Navy during the 1810s. The ship was never completed and was scrapped in 1816.

== Description ==
The later Océan-class ships had a length of 63.83 metres (209 ft 5 in) at the gun deck a beam of 16.4 metres (53 ft 10 in) and a depth of hold of 8.12 metres (26 ft 8 in). The ships displaced 5095 tonneaux and had a mean draught of 8.14 metres (26 ft 8 in). They had a tonnage of 2,794–2,930 port tonneaux. Their crew numbered 1,130 officers and ratings. They were fitted with three masts and ship rigged with a sail area of 3,250 square metres (35,000 sq ft).

The muzzle-loading, smoothbore armament of the Océan class consisted of thirty-two 36-pounder long guns on the lower gun deck, thirty-four 24-pounder long guns on the middle gun deck and on the upper gundeck were thirty-four 18-pounder long guns. On the quarterdeck and forecastle were a total of fourteen 8-pounder long guns and a dozen 36-pounder carronades.

== Construction ==
Sans Pareil was ordered on 15 March 1811, renamed Roi de Rome (after the title that Napoleon had awarded to his newborn son) on 18 April, and was laid down at the Arsenal de Brest later that month. Construction was suspended that same month. The ship was renamed Inflexible on 21 May and then resumed her original name on 21 December. She remained in an unfinished state until June 1816, when some of her wood was found to have rotted, and she was broken up. The sound timbers were used during the refitting of Wagram in 1818–1821.

A model of an 80-gun two-decker named Roi de Rome (CnAM 4024) is on display at the Musée des Arts et Métiers in Paris; the ship is fictitious and bears no connection to 120-gun Roi de Rome.
