= French ship Impérial (1811) =

Ship of the line of the French Navy

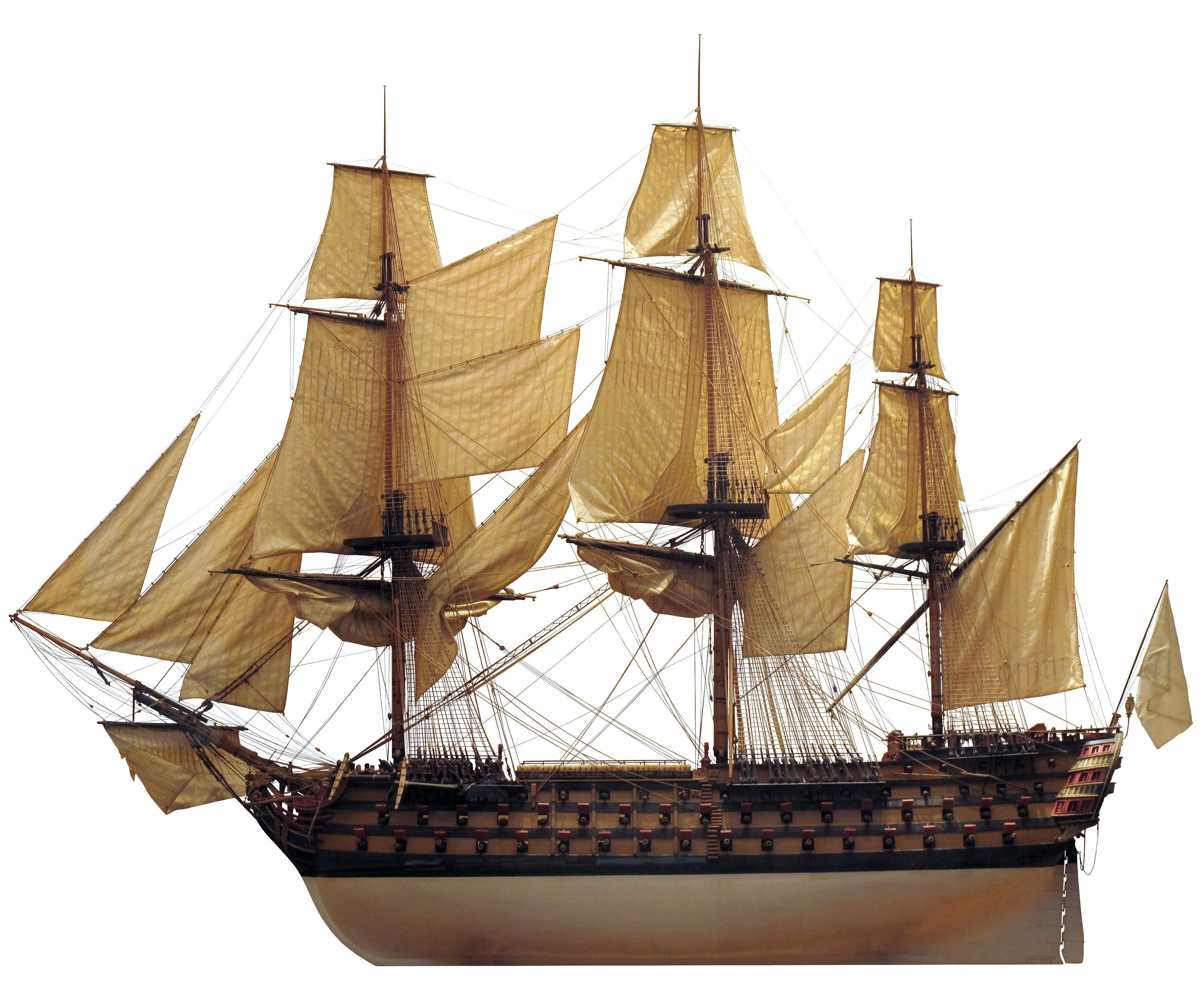
- Model of Commerce de Marseille, Impérial's sister ship

History

France
- Builder: François Poncet, Toulon Dyd
- Laid down: July 1810
- Launched: 1 December 1811
- Completed: August 1812
- Fate: Broken up 1825

General characteristics
- Class & type: Océan-class ship of the line
- Displacement: 5,095 tonneaux
- Tons burthen: 2,794–2,930 port tonneaux
- Length: 63.83 m (209 ft 5 in) (gun deck)
- Beam: 16.4 m (53 ft 10 in)
- Draught: 8.14 m (26 ft 8 in)
- Depth of hold: 8.12 m (26 ft 8 in)
- Propulsion: sail, 3,250 m^{2} (35,000 sq ft)
- Sail plan: full-rigged ship
- Complement: 1,130
- Armament: Lower gun deck:: 32 × 36 pdr guns; Middle gun deck: 34 × 24 pdr guns; Upper gun deck: 34 × 18 pdr guns; Forecastle & quarterdeck: 14 × 8 pdr guns + 12 × 36 pdr carronades

Impérial was a first-rate 118-gun Océan-class ship of the line built for the French Navy during the 1810s. Completed in 1812, the ship was the French flagship during the Action of 5 November 1813 during the Napoleonic Wars. She was condemned in 1825 and was subsequently scrapped.

== Description ==
The later Océan-class ships had a length of 63.83 metres (209 ft 5 in) at the gun deck a beam of 16.4 metres (53 ft 10 in) and a depth of hold of 8.12 metres (26 ft 8 in). The ships displaced 5095 tonneaux and had a mean draught of 8.14 metres (26 ft 8 in). They had a tonnage of 2,794–2,930 port tonneaux. Their crew numbered 1,130 officers and ratings. They were fitted with three masts and ship rigged with a sail area of 3,250 square metres (35,000 sq ft).

The muzzle-loading, smoothbore armament of the Océan class consisted of thirty-two 36-pounder long guns on the lower gun deck, thirty-four 24-pounder long guns on the middle gun deck and on the upper gundeck were thirty-four 18-pounder long guns. On the quarterdeck and forecastle were a total of fourteen 8-pounder long guns and a dozen 36-pounder carronades.

== Career ==
Impérial was ordered on 4 June 1810 and was laid down at the Arsenal de Toulon on 2 July. The ship was named on 14 July, launched on 1 December 1811. She was completed in August 1812 and commissioned on 24 August. The ship was renamed Royal Louis in April 1814 following the downfall of the First Empire, but resumed the name Impérial in March 1815 when Napoléon returned to France. After the Hundred Days and the restitution of Louis XVIII, she was again renamed Royal Louis on 15 July 1815. The ship was briefly armed on 29 April 1816, but was disarmed on 11 June. She was condemned on 31 March 1825 and broken up later that year.
