= French ship Héros (1813) =

Ship of the line of the French Navy

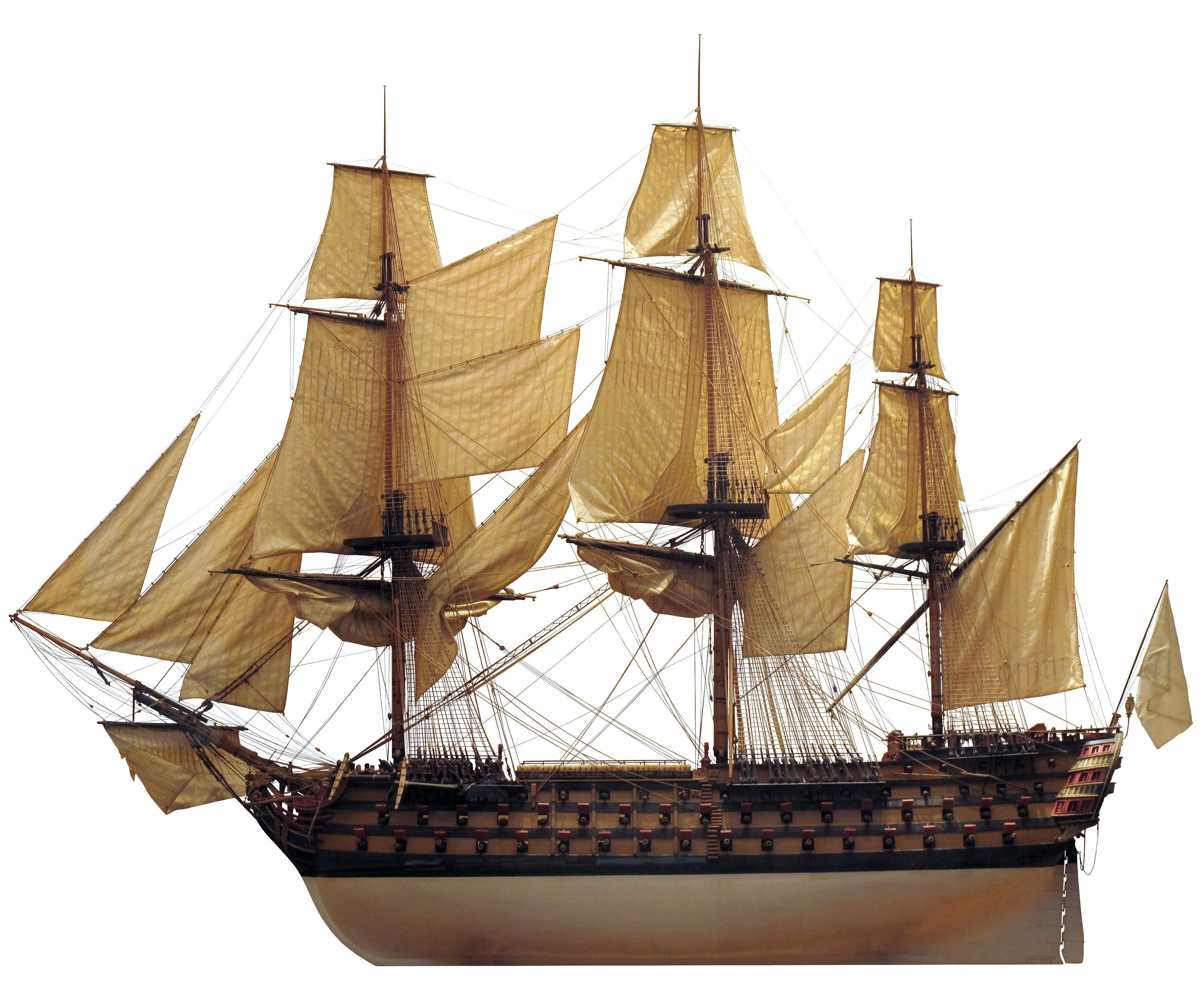
- Model of Commerce de Marseille, Héros's sister ship

History

France
- Name: Héros
- Namesake: French ship Héros
- Launched: 15 August 1813
- Fate: Condemned 1828

General characteristics
- Class & type: Océan-class ship of the line
- Displacement: 5,095 tonneaux
- Tons burthen: 2,794–2,930 port tonneaux
- Length: 63.83 m (209 ft 5 in) (gun deck)
- Beam: 16.4 m (53 ft 10 in)
- Draught: 8.14 m (26 ft 8 in)
- Depth: 8.12 m (26 ft 8 in)
- Propulsion: sail, 3,250 m^{2} (35,000 sq ft)
- Sail plan: full-rigged ship
- Complement: 1,130
- Armament: Lower gun deck:: 32 × 36 pdr guns; Middle gun deck: 34 × 24 pdr guns; Upper gun deck: 34 × 18 pdr guns; Forecastle & quarterdeck: 14 × 8 pdr guns + 12 × 36 pdr carronades

Héros was a first-rate 118-gun Océan-class ship of the line built for the French Navy during the 1810s. Completed in 1814, the ship did not play a significant role in the Napoleonic Wars. She was never commissioned and was struck from the navy list in 1828.

== Description ==
The later Océan-class ships had a length of 63.83 metres (209 ft 5 in) at the gun deck a beam of 16.4 metres (53 ft 10 in) and a depth of hold of 8.12 metres (26 ft 8 in). The ships displaced 5095 tonneaux and had a mean draught of 8.14 metres (26 ft 8 in). They had a tonnage of 2,794–2,930 port tonneaux. Their crew numbered 1,130 officers and ratings. They were fitted with three masts and ship rigged with a sail area of 3,250 square metres (35,000 sq ft).

The muzzle-loading, smoothbore armament of the Océan class consisted of thirty-two 36-pounder long guns on the lower gun deck, thirty-four 24-pounder long guns on the middle gun deck and on the upper gundeck were thirty-four 18-pounder long guns. On the quarterdeck and forecastle were a total of fourteen 8-pounder long guns and a dozen 36-pounder carronades.

== Construction and career ==
Héros was ordered on 20 February 1812, laid down at the Arsenal de Toulon in April 1812. The ship was named on 21 May after Héros, flagship of Pierre André de Suffren de Saint Tropez during the Anglo-French War. She was launched on 15 August 1813 and completed in January 1814. Héros was disarmed on 1 April 1816, stricken on 10 March 1828 and hulked without having ever been commissioned. When Héros was broken up for scrap is unknown.
