= French ship Montebello (1812) =

Ship of the line of the French Navy

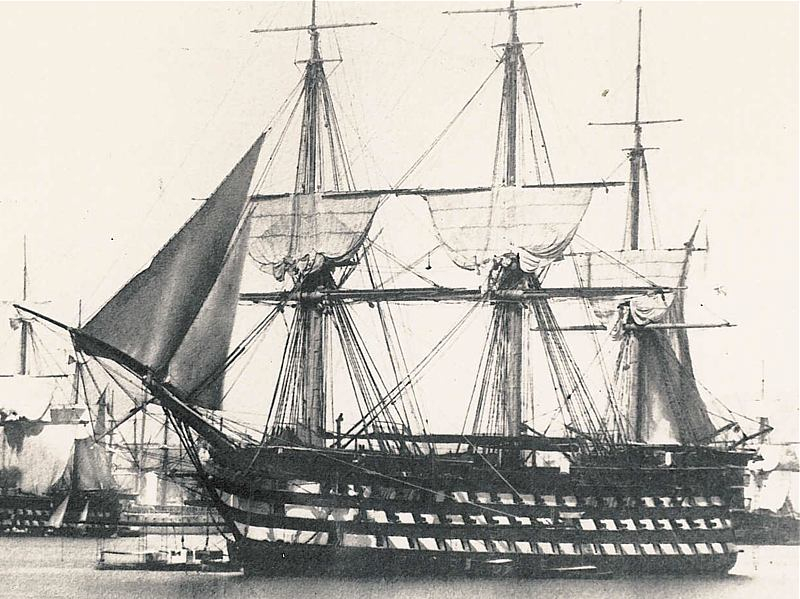
- Montebello circa 1850

History

France
- Namesake: Battle of Montebello
- Laid down: 1810
- Launched: 6 December 1812
- Fate: Scrapped, 1889

General characteristics (as built)
- Class & type: Océan-class ship of the line
- Displacement: 5,095 tonneaux
- Tons burthen: 2,794–2,930 port tonneaux
- Length: 63.83 m (209 ft 5 in) (gun deck)
- Beam: 16.4 m (53 ft 10 in)
- Draught: 8.14 m (26 ft 8 in)
- Depth of hold: 8.12 m (26 ft 8 in)
- Propulsion: sail, 3,250 m^{2} (35,000 sq ft)
- Sail plan: full-rigged ship
- Complement: 1,130
- Armament: Lower gun deck:: 32 × 36 pdr guns; Middle gun deck: 34 × 24 pdr guns; Upper gun deck: 34 × 18 pdr guns; Forecastle & quarterdeck: 14 × 8 pdr guns + 12 × 36 pdr carronades

Montebello was a first-rate 118-gun Océan-class ship of the line built for the French Navy during the 1810s. Completed in 1813, the ship did not play a significant role in the Napoleonic Wars. She was converted to steam in 1851–1852 and participated in the Crimean War of 1854–1855.

== Description ==
The later Océan-class ships had a length of 63.83 metres (209 ft 5 in) at the gun deck a beam of 16.4 metres (53 ft 10 in) and a depth of hold of 8.12 metres (26 ft 8 in). The ships displaced 5095 tonneaux and had a mean draught of 8.14 metres (26 ft 8 in). They had a tonnage of 2,794–2,930 port tonneaux. Their crew numbered 1,130 officers and ratings. They were fitted with three masts and ship rigged with a sail area of 3,250 square metres (35,000 sq ft).

The muzzle-loading, smoothbore armament of the Océan class consisted of thirty-two 36-pounder long guns on the lower gun deck, thirty-four 24-pounder long guns on the middle gun deck and on the upper gundeck were thirty-four 18-pounder long guns. On the quarterdeck and forecastle were a total of fourteen 8-pounder long guns and a dozen 36-pounder carronades.

== Career ==
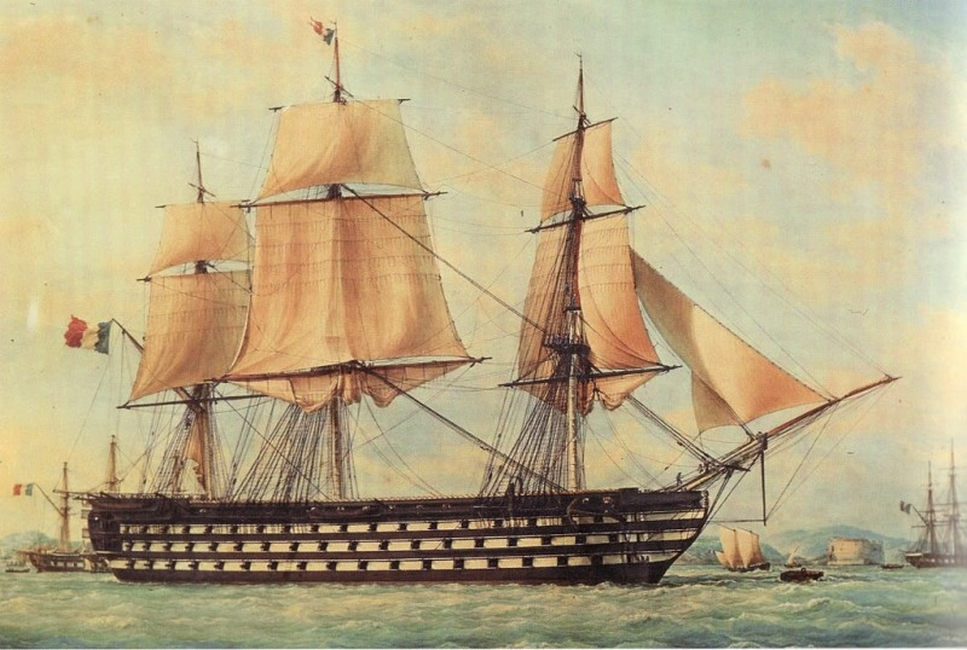
Portrait of Montebello, by François Roux

Montebello was ordered in 1810 and was laid down at the Arsenal de Toulon in October of that year. The ship was launched on 6 December 1812, commissioned on 1 July 1813 and completed the following month.

On 31 October 1836, she was driven ashore at the Grosse Tour, Toulon. She was subsequently refloated.

On 5 March 1855 she took part in the Siege of Sevastopol, then in the expedition to Kerch and in the Battle of Kinburn. In 1860, Montebello replaced Suffren at Toulon as a school-ship for gunnery, and in 1867, she was used as a floating barracks. She was scrapped in 1889.
