= French ship Majestueux =

Three ships of the French Navy have borne the name Majestueux ("Majestic"):

- Majestueux (1757), an unfinished three-decker
- Majestueux (1780), a 110-gun ship of the line
- République française (1802), a 120-gun ship of the line, was renamed Majestueux in 1803.
