= French ship Austerlitz (1808) =

Ship of the line of the French Navy

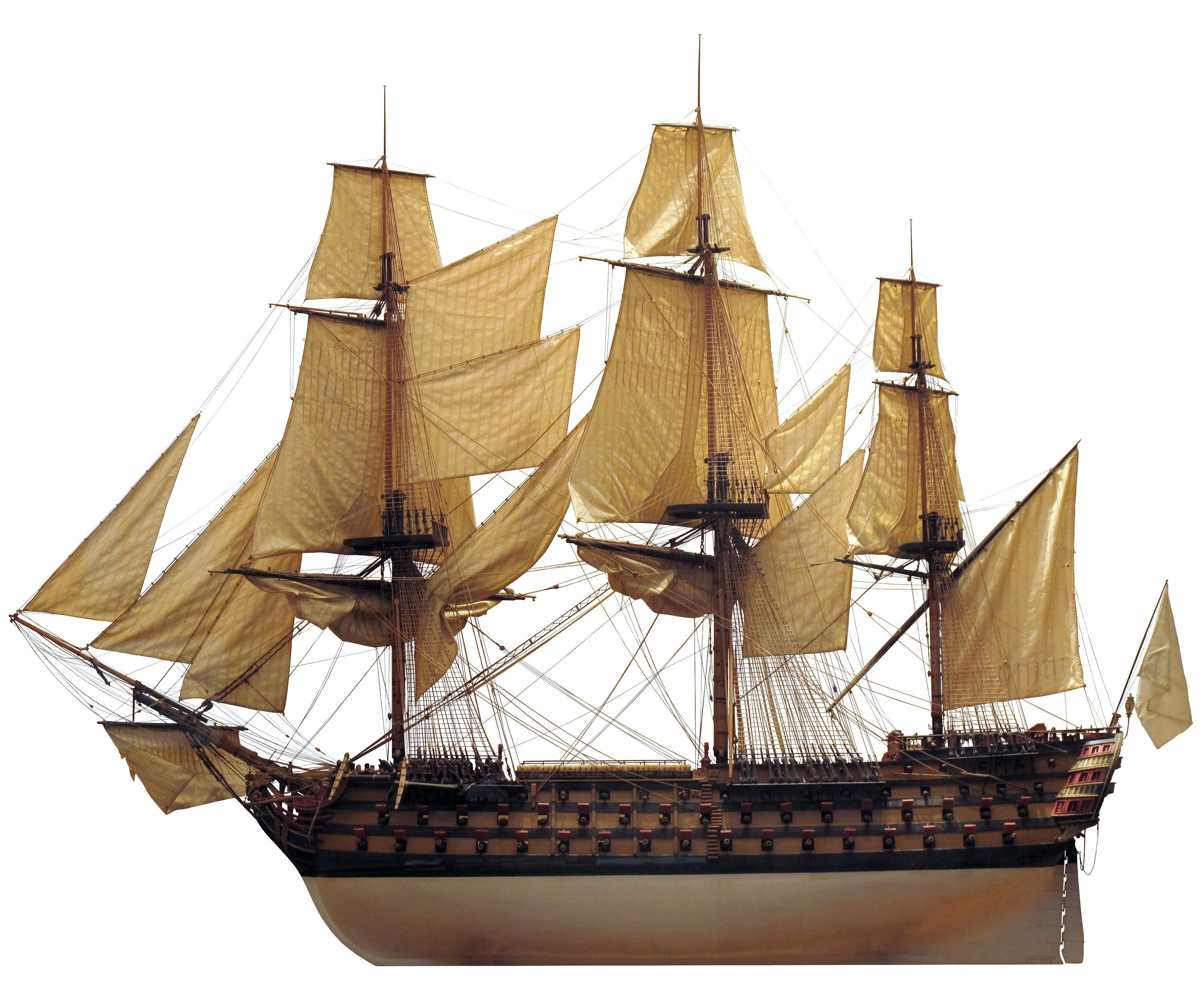
- Model of Commerce de Marseille, Austerlitz's sister ship

History

France
- Name: Austerlitz
- Ordered: 1805
- Launched: 15 August 1808
- Completed: 1809
- Fate: Broken, 1837

General characteristics
- Class & type: Océan-class ship of the line
- Displacement: 5,095 tonneaux
- Tons burthen: 2,794–2,930 port tonneaux
- Length: 63.83 m (209 ft 5 in) (gun deck)
- Beam: 16.4 m (53 ft 10 in)
- Draught: 8.14 m (26 ft 8 in)
- Depth of hold: 8.12 m (26 ft 8 in)
- Propulsion: sail, 3,250 m^{2} (35,000 sq ft)
- Sail plan: full-rigged ship
- Complement: 1,130
- Armament: Lower gun deck:: 32 × 36 pdr guns; Middle gun deck: 34 × 24 pdr guns; Upper gun deck: 34 × 18 pdr guns; Forecastle & quarterdeck: 14 × 8 pdr guns + 12 × 36 pdr carronades

Austerlitz was a first-rate 118-gun Océan-class ship of the line built for the French Navy during the first decade of the 19th century. Completed in 1809, the ship did not play a significant role in the Napoleonic Wars. She was refitted in 1821–1822, but was never recommissioned afterwards.

== Description ==
The later Océan-class ships had a length of 63.83 metres (209 ft 5 in) at the gun deck a beam of 16.4 metres (53 ft 10 in) and a depth of hold of 8.12 metres (26 ft 8 in). The ships displaced 5095 tonneaux and had a mean draught of 8.14 metres (26 ft 8 in). They had a tonnage of 2,794–2,930 port tonneaux. Their crew numbered 1,130 officers and ratings. They were fitted with three masts and ship rigged with a sail area of 3,250 square metres (35,000 sq ft).

The muzzle-loading, smoothbore armament of the Océan class consisted of thirty-two 36-pounder long guns on the lower gun deck, thirty-four 24-pounder long guns on the middle gun deck and on the upper gundeck were thirty-four 18-pounder long guns. On the quarterdeck and forecastle were a total of fourteen 8-pounder long guns and a dozen 36-pounder carronades.

== Career ==
Austerlitz was ordered on 19 December 1805 and was laid down at the Arsenal de Toulon on 10 April. The ship was launched on 15 August 1808, commissioned on 16 August 1809 and completed later that month. On 29 August 1814, after the Hundred Days, she was transferred from Toulon to Brest, along with Wagram and Commerce de Paris, where she was disarmed on 1 December. Austerlitz received a lengthy refit in 1821–1822, but was never recommissioned afterwards. The ship was eventually struck on 8 March 1837 and subsequently broken up.
