= French ship Souverain (1819) =

Ship of the line of the French Navy

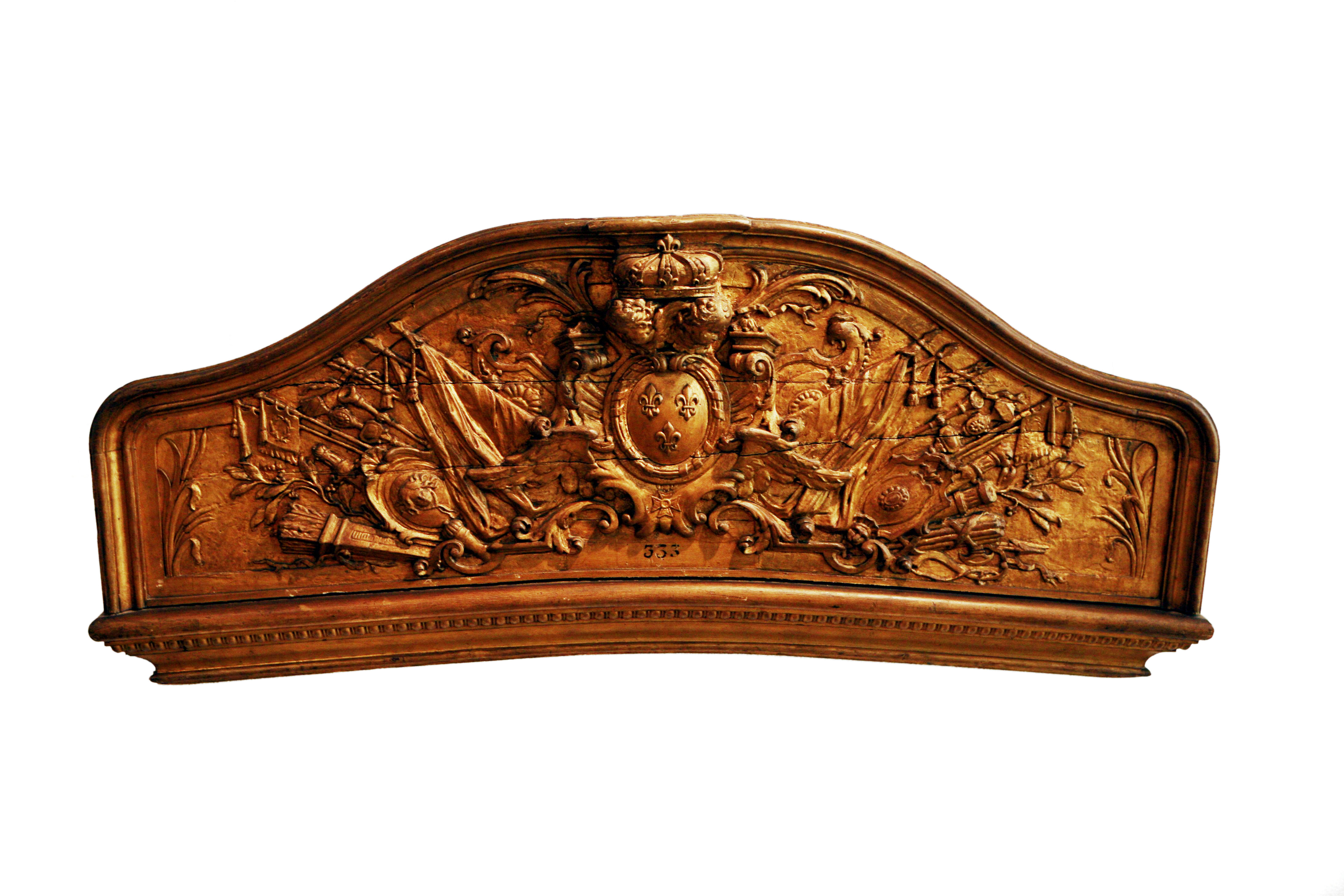
- Decorative aft panel of Souverain, on display at Toulon naval museum

History

France
- Namesake: "Sovereign"
- Builder: Toulon
- Laid down: 1813
- Launched: 25 August 1819
- Fate: Scrapped in 1905

General characteristics
- Class & type: Océan class ship of the line
- Displacement: 5,095 tonneaux
- Tons burthen: 2,794–2,930 port tonneaux
- Length: 65.18 m (213.8 ft) (196,6 French feet)
- Beam: 16.24 m (53.3 ft) (50 French feet)
- Draught: 8.12 m (26.6 ft) (25 French feet)
- Propulsion: sail, 3 265 m²; 2400 shp steam engine (from 1853)
- Complement: 1,079 men
- Armament: Rated as 120-gun: lower deck: 32 36-pounder guns; middle deck: 34 24-pounder guns; upper deck: 34 18-pounder guns; forecastle: 18 8-pounder guns, 6 36-pounder carronades

Souverain was an Océan type 118-gun ship of the line of the French Navy. She was launched in 1819 and transformed into a steam ship in 1853.

== Service history ==
Launched in 1819, Souverain was not commissioned before 16 April 1840. She then became the flagship of the Second Division of the Mediterranean Squadron, under the Captain Jouglas from 1841, and later under Captain Daguenet from 1842.

In 1842, the squadron patrolled the coast of Italy; a notable alumni of the cruise was then-Ensign Jean-Bernard Jauréguiberry.

Decommissioned after the cruise, Souverain was reactivated on 1 April 1846 to serve as the flagship of Joinville's escadre d’évolutions, with Captain Charner as flag officer. In July 1847, the squadron sailed to Tripoli on a background of tensions between France, Tripoli and Tunis.

In 1848, Admiral Charles Baudin relieved Joinville as head of the squadron. Baudin set his mark on Friedland, while Souverain, under Captain Le Barbier de Titian, remained as one of the strongest units of the squadron. She served off Italy, before returning to Toulon and being decommissioned on 18 November 1848.

From November 1853, engineer Sylvestre du Perron directed work on Souverain to add a 600-shp steam engine, after plans by Henri Dupuy de Lôme, without lengthening the ship; Souverain started her new trials in June 1857, under Commander de Jouslard. In her new configuration, she still carried 110 guns. In 1862, she was reconfigured as a troopship for the Second French intervention in Mexico, with only 16 30-pounder long guns, under Captain Sévin. Souverain was listed in the reserve between 1863 and November 1866, when she took part in the French retreat from Mexico, under Captain Leblanc.

In February 1877, Souverain was recommissioned as a gunnery school, with a particular artillery and configuration to train gunners, comprising. She was under Captain Lefort from 1877 to 1878; Massias-Jurien de la Gravière from 1879 to 1880; Captain de Labarrière from 1881 to 1882; Alquier from 1883 to 1884; and Augey Dufresse in 1885. At this point, Couronne replaced her as school-ship for gunnery training, and she became a pontoon used as barracks for the Infanterie coloniale in Toulon.

Souverain in Toulon as barracks hulk
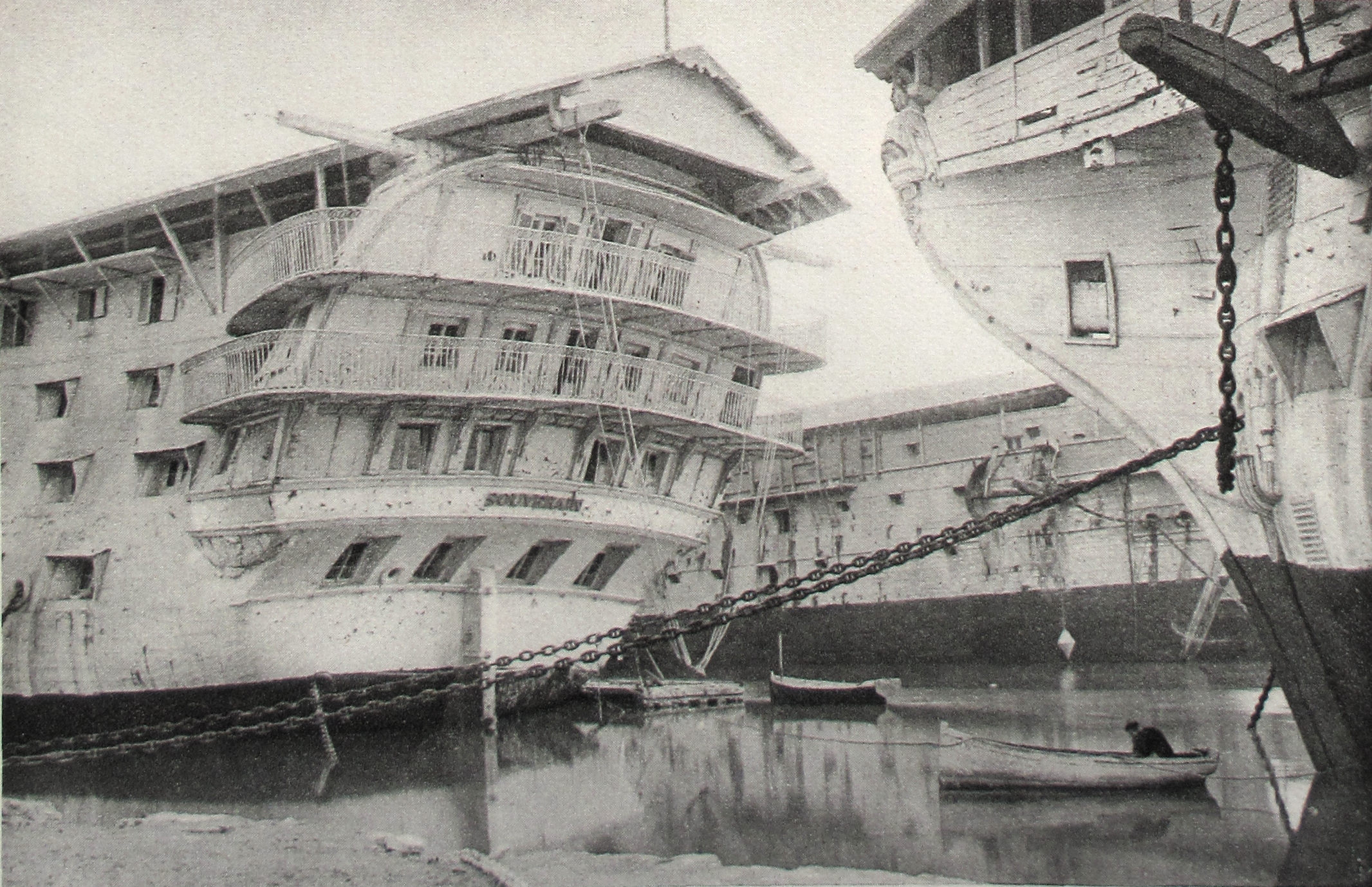
Souverain as a hulk in Toulon harbour

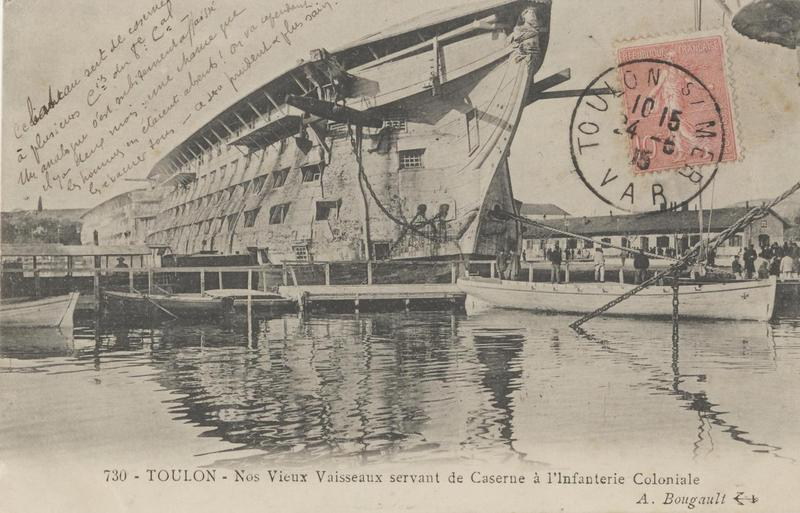
Souverain as a hulk in Toulon harbour

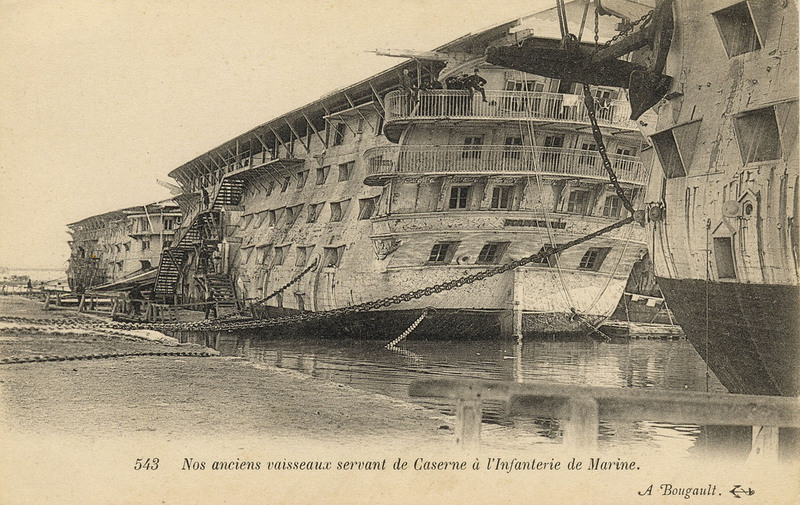
Mars, Souverain and Eylau in Toulon harbour

Souverain was eventually sold for scrap and broken up in 1905.
