= French ship Trocadéro (1824) =

Ship of the line of the French Navy

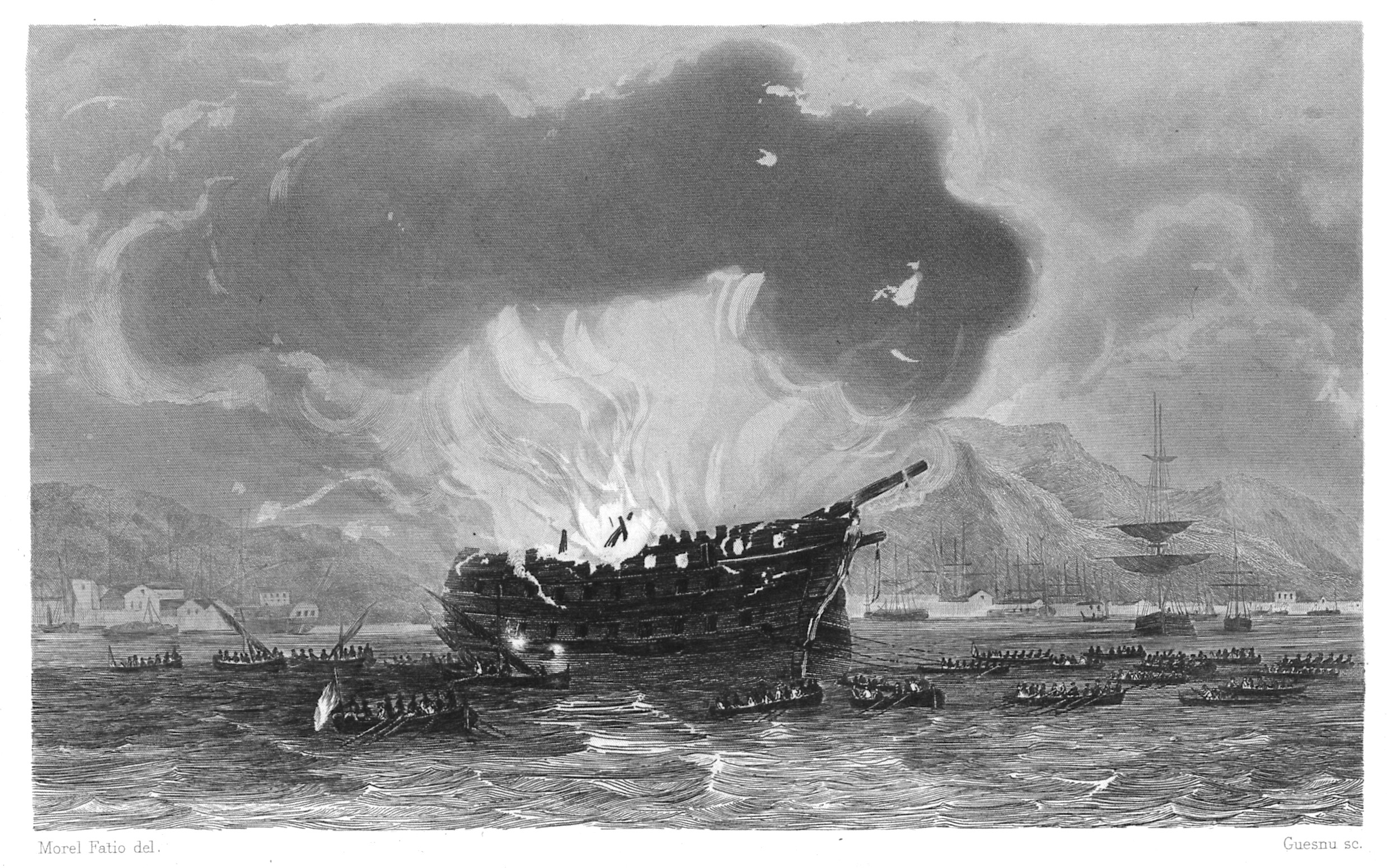
- Explosion of Trocadéro. Drawing by Antoine Morel-Fatio.

History

France
- Name: Trocadéro
- Launched: 14 April 1824
- Fate: Destroyed by fire, 24 March 1836

General characteristics
- Class & type: Océan-class ship of the line
- Displacement: 5,095 tonneaux
- Tons burthen: 2,794–2,930 port tonneaux
- Length: 63.83 m (209 ft 5 in) (gun deck)
- Beam: 16.4 m (53 ft 10 in)
- Draught: 8.14 m (26 ft 8 in)
- Depth of hold: 8.12 m (26 ft 8 in)
- Propulsion: sail, 3,250 m^{2} (35,000 sq ft)
- Sail plan: full-rigged ship
- Complement: 1,130
- Armament: Lower gun deck:: 32 × 36 pdr guns; Middle gun deck: 34 × 24 pdr guns; Upper gun deck: 34 × 18 pdr guns; Forecastle & quarterdeck: 14 × 8 pdr guns + 12 × 36 pdr carronades

Trocadéro was a first-rate 118-gun Océan-class ship of the line built for the French Navy during the 1810s. Completed in 1824, the ship was never commissioned. She was accidentally destroyed by fire in 1836.

== Description ==
The later Océan-class ships had a length of 63.83 metres (209 ft 5 in) at the gun deck and were 57.82 metres (189 ft 8 in) long at the keel. They had a beam of 16.4 metres (53 ft 10 in) and a depth of hold of 8.12 metres (26 ft 8 in). The ships displaced 5095 tonneaux and had a mean draught of 8.14 metres (26 ft 8 in). They had a tonnage of 2,794–2,930 port tonneaux. Their crew numbered 1,130 officers and ratings. They were fitted with three masts and ship rigged with a sail area of 3,250 square metres (35,000 sq ft).

The muzzle-loading, smoothbore armament of the Océan class consisted of thirty-two 36-pounder long guns on the lower gun deck, thirty-four 24-pounder long guns on the middle gun deck and on the upper gundeck were thirty-four 18-pounder long guns. On the quarterdeck and forecastle were a total of fourteen 8-pounder long guns and a dozen 36-pounder carronades.

== Construction and career ==
Trocadero was ordered on 20 March 1813 with the name Formidable and was laid down at the Arsenal de Toulon in September. She remained on the stocks until the French Navy decided that she was needed. The ship was renamed Trocadero in 1823, launched on 14 April 1824, and completed in October without being commissioned. On 24 March 1836, as she was refitting in Toulon, she was accidentally set afire and destroyed.
