= French ship République française (1802) =

Ship of the line of the French Navy

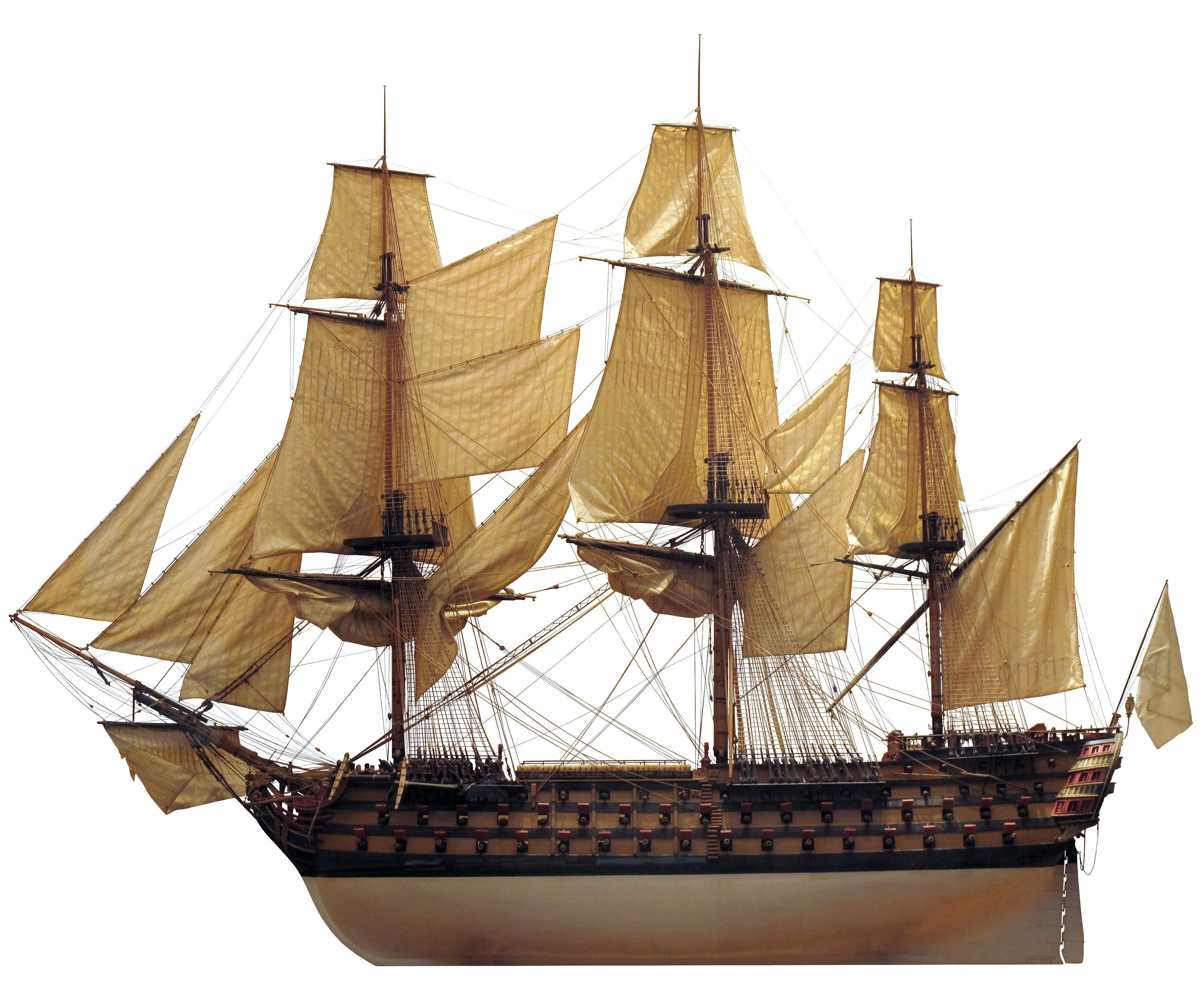
- Model of Commerce de Marseille, République française's sister ship

History

France
- Namesake: French Republic
- Builder: Pierre Rolland, Rochefort Dyd
- Laid down: March 1794
- Launched: 18 April 1802
- Completed: August 1803
- Fate: Scrapped 1839

General characteristics
- Class & type: Océan-class ship of the line
- Displacement: 5,095 tonneaux
- Tons burthen: 2,794–2,930 port tonneaux
- Length: 63.83 m (209 ft 5 in) (gun deck)
- Beam: 16.24 m (53 ft 3 in)
- Draught: 8.15 m (26 ft 9 in)
- Depth of hold: 8.12 m (26 ft 8 in)
- Propulsion: sail, 3,250 m^{2} (35,000 sq ft)
- Sail plan: full-rigged ship
- Complement: 1,117
- Armament: Lower gun deck:: 32 × 36 pdr guns; Middle gun deck: 34 × 24 pdr guns; Upper gun deck: 34 × 12 pdr guns; Forecastle & quarterdeck: 18 × 8 pdr guns + 6 × 36 pdr obusiers

République française was an 118-gun Océan-class ship of the line of the French Navy launched in 1802. Renamed Majestueux in 1803, the ship was completed that same year. She played a minor role during the Napoleonic Wars before being scrapped in 1839.

== Description ==
The Océan-class ships had a length of 63.83 metres (209 ft 5 in) at the gun deck a beam of 16.24 metres (53 ft 3 in) and a depth of hold of 8.12 metres (26 ft 8 in). The ships displaced 5095 tonneaux and had a mean draught of 8.15 metres (26 ft 9 in). They had a tonnage of 2,794–2,930 port tonneaux. Their crew numbered 1,117 officers and ratings. They were fitted with three masts and ship rigged with a sail area of 3,250 square metres (35,000 sq ft).

The muzzle-loading, smoothbore armament of the Océan class consisted of thirty-two 36-pounder long guns on the lower gun deck, thirty-four 24-pounder long guns on the middle gun deck and on the upper gundeck were thirty-four 12-pounder long guns. On the quarterdeck and forecastle were a total of eighteen 8-pounder long guns and six 30-pounder obusiers.

== Career ==
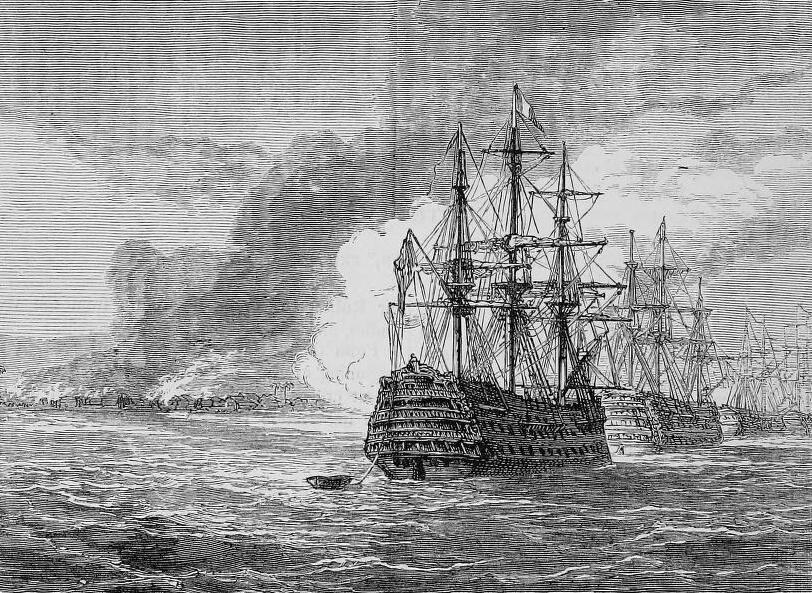
Majestueux at the burning of Roseau on 22 February 1805

République Française was laid down at the Arsenal de Rochefort on 23 March 1794, although construction soon stopped. It was resumed on 22 March 1800 by Entreprise Destouches and the ship was launched on 18 April 1802. She was renamed Majestueux on 5 February 1802, commissioned on 1 August 1803 and completed later that month.

The ship took part in Allemand's expedition of 1805. She was stricken from the navy list on 26 January 1839, decommissioned on 11 April and subsequently broken up.
