= French ship Souverain (1757) =

French Naval Ship

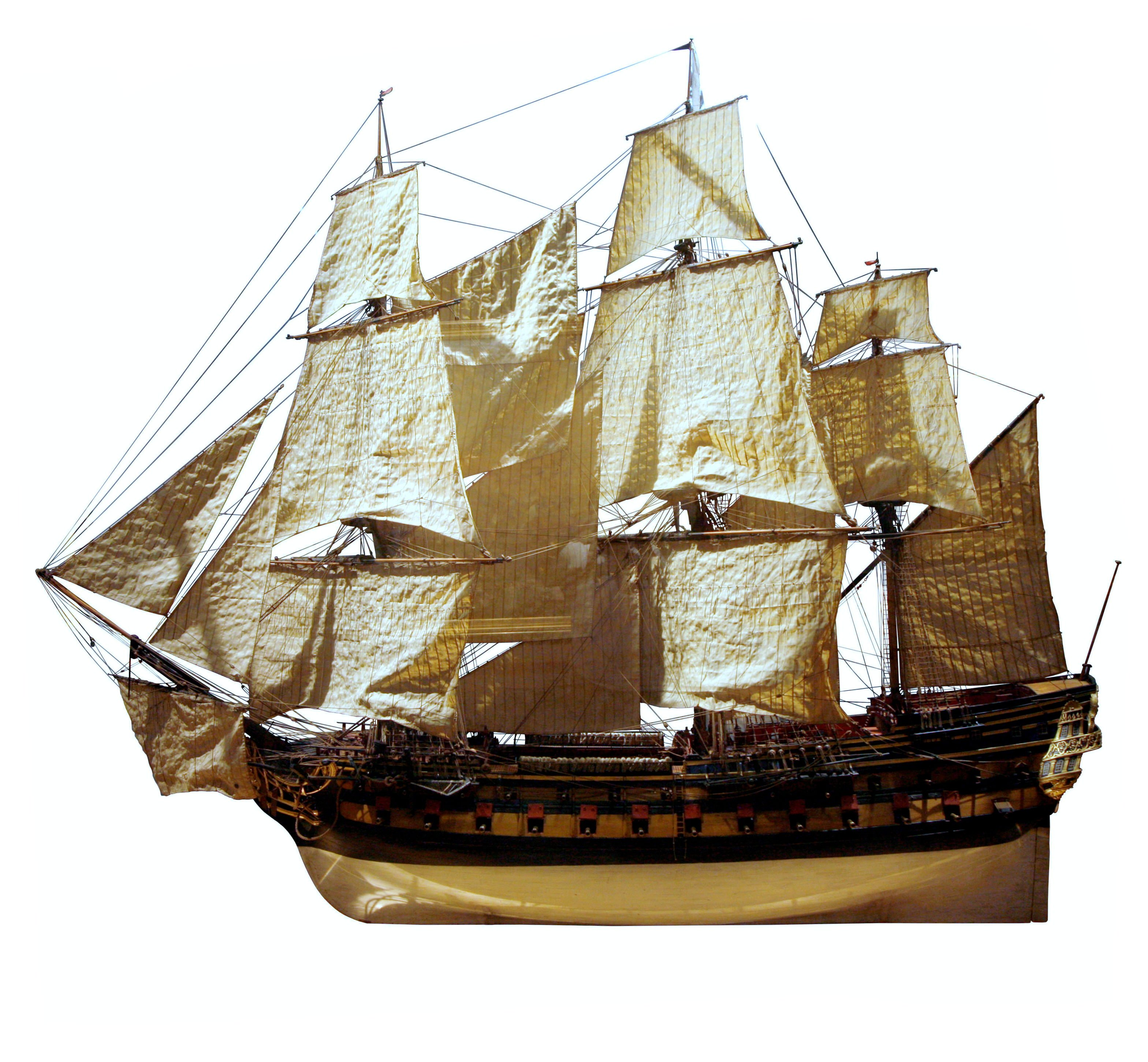
- Model of Protecteur, Souverain's sister ship

History

France
- Name: Souverain
- Namesake: "Sovereign"
- Ordered: 25 October 1755
- Builder: Toulon
- Laid down: December 1755
- Launched: 6 May 1757
- In service: November 1757
- Renamed: Peuple Souverain in September 1792
- Captured: 2 August 1798

Great Britain
- Name: Guerrier
- Acquired: 12 August 1798
- Fate: Guard ship, Broken up 1810

General characteristics
- Class & type: Souverain-class ship of the line
- Displacement: 2800 tonneaux
- Tons burthen: 1536 port tonneaux
- Length: 53.3 m (175 ft)
- Beam: 14.1 m (46 ft)
- Draught: 7.1 m (23 ft)
- Propulsion: Sail
- Armament: 28 × 36-pounders; 30 × 18-pounders; 16 × 8-pounders

Souverain was a 74-gun ship of the line of the French Navy, lead ship of her class.

She took part in the Battle of the Chesapeake, in 1781. In 1792, she was renamed Peuple Souverain ("Sovereign People").

In 1798, she took part in the battle of the Nile. A shot from HMS Orion (at the rear of the British line) cut her cable and she drifted out of position, later in the battle being captured by the British.

She was subsequently recommissioned in the Royal Navy as HMS Guerrier, but was in too bad a shape to serve in the high sea, so she was used as a guard ship. She was broken up in 1810.
