= Étienne de Grasse-Limermont =

French Navy officer

Etienne de Grasse-Limermont (Oise, 1725 — Toulon, 1790) was a French Navy officer. He took part in the War of American Independence, earning a membership in the Society of Cincinnati.

== Biography ==
Limermont joined the Navy as a Garde-Marine in 1741. He served on Toulouse and took part in the Battle of Toulon on 22 February 1744.

Limermont was promoted to Ensign in 1748, and to Lieutenant in 1756. That same year, he took part in the Battle of Minorca on Lion. He rose to Commander in 1764, to captain in 1771.

Limermont served as first officer Guerrier at the Battle of Rhode Island and during the Siege of Savannah. He later commanded the 74-gun Protecteur at the Battle of Grenada on 6 July 1779.

In 1782, he was promoted to Brigadier des Armées navales. He retired that same year on medical ground.

His son, Étienne Marc Antoine Joseph de Grasse-Limermont, also served in the French Navy, before switching sides and fleeing France to work for the British.

== Sources and references ==
Notes

Citations

References

- Contenson, Ludovic (1934). La Société des Cincinnati de France et la guerre d'Amérique (1778-1783). Paris: éditions Auguste Picard. OCLC 7842336.
- Lacour-Gayet, Georges (1905). La marine militaire de la France sous le règne de Louis XVI. Paris: Honoré Champion. OCLC 763372623.

External links

- Rouxel, Jean-Christophe. "Etienne de GRASSE de LIMERMONT".
