= HMS Inflexible =

Five ships of the Royal Navy have been called HMS Inflexible.

- HMS Inflexible (1776) was a 280-ton sloop-of-war launched in 1776. HMS Inflexible was disassembled at Quebec City and transported upriver in pieces and reassembled and commissioned 1776 at Saint-Jean on the upper Richelieu River upon a request of General Carleton. She carried eighteen 12-pounders. She fought at the Battle of Valcour Island in 1776 under the command of John Schank. Her fate is unknown.
- HMS Inflexible (1780) was a 64-gun third-rate Inflexible-class ship of the line launched in 1780. She was used as a storeship from 1793, a troopship from 1809 and was broken up in 1820.
- HMS Inflexible (1845) was a wooden screw sloop launched in 1845 and sold in 1864.
- HMS Inflexible (1876) was an ironclad battleship launched in 1876 and sold in 1903.
- HMS Inflexible (1907) was an Invincible-class battlecruiser launched in 1907 and sold for scrapping in 1921.

== Battle honours ==
Ships named Inflexible have earned the following battle honours:

- Lake Champlain, 1776
- Egypt, 1801
- New Zealand, 1845−47
- Crimea, 1854−55
- China, 1856−60
- Alexandria, 1882
- Falkland Islands, 1914
- Dardanelles, 1915
- Jutland, 1916

== See also ==
- French ship Inflexible
