= Étienne Marc Antoine Joseph de Grasse-Limermont =

French Navy officer

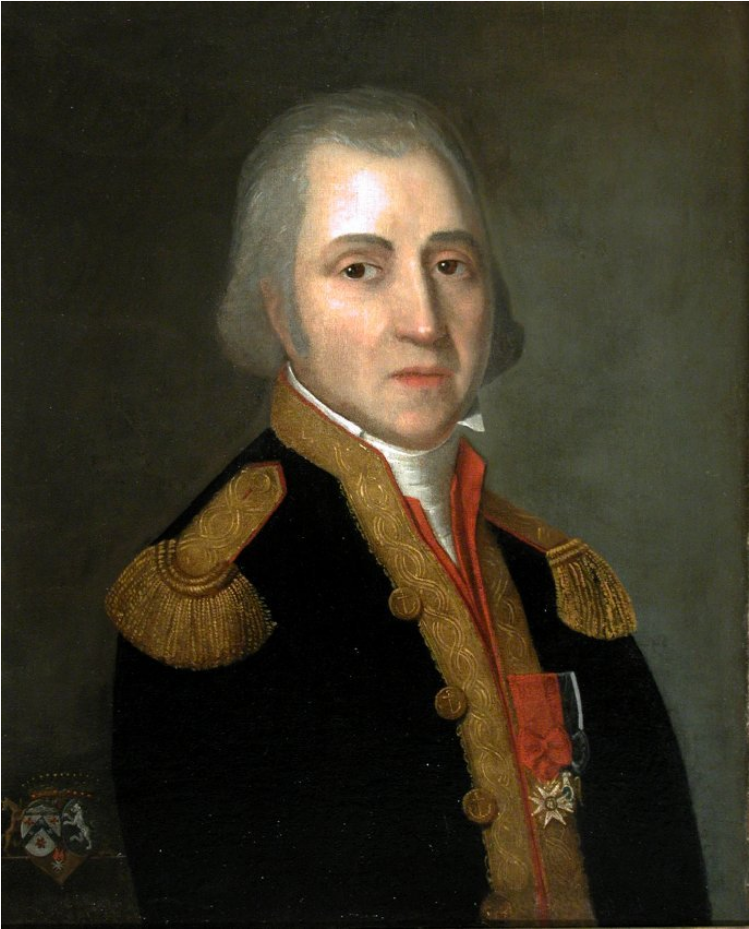
- Born: 28 June 1757 Toulon, France
- Died: 20 February 1838 (aged 80) Saint-Nazaire, near Toulon
- Branch: French Navy
- Rank: Contre-amiral
- Conflicts: Battle of Rhode Island; Battle of Fort Royal; Invasion of Tobago; Battle of the Saintes; Siege of Toulon

Étienne Marc Antoine Joseph de Grasse-Limermont (Toulon, 28 June 1757 – Saint-Nazaire, near Toulon, 20 February 1838) was a French Navy officer. He took part in the War of American Independence, earning a membership in the Society of Cincinnati. A Royalist, he betrayed France and was an aid to Trogoff when he surrendered Toulon and its fleet to the British. He remained employed by the British until 1814.

== Biography ==
Limermont was born to the family of Anne Gabrielle Françoise de Ricard de Tourtour, and of Captain Étienne de Grasse-Limermont. He joined the Navy as a Garde-Marine on 25 December 1771. He served on the frigate Aimable and took part in the Battle of Rhode Island on 29 August 1778.

On 29 April 1781, he captained the 18-gun cutter Pandour at the Battle of Fort Royal. In May 1781, he took part in the Invasion of Tobago, and was tasked with bringing news of the French victory back to France. The same year, he was promoted to Lieutenant. In April 1782, he was still in command Pandour, and he took part in the Battle of the Saintes.

He was promoted to Captain in 1792. The year after, he had command of the frigate Topaze.

During the Siege of Toulon, he fled with those of the French ships he had managed to surrender to the British. After Trogoff died in February, Limermont assumed command of the royalist squadron and sailed it to England.

He returned to France at the Bourbon Restauration, and was promoted to Contre-amiral, on 8 July 1816. He retired from the Navy the year after.

== Sources and references ==
Notes

Citations

References

- Contenson, Ludovic (1934). La Société des Cincinnati de France et la guerre d'Amérique (1778–1783). Paris: éditions Auguste Picard. OCLC 7842336.
- Kerguelen, Yves-Joseph (1796). Relation des combats et des évènements de la guerre maritime de 1778 entre la France et l'Angleterre (in French). Imprimerie de Patris.
- Lacour-Gayet, Georges (1905). La marine militaire de la France sous le règne de Louis XVI. Paris: Honoré Champion. OCLC 763372623.
- Troude, Onésime-Joachim (1867). Batailles navales de la France (in French). Vol. 2. Challamel ainé. OCLC 836362484.
