= French ship Wagram (1810) =

Ship of the line of the French Navy

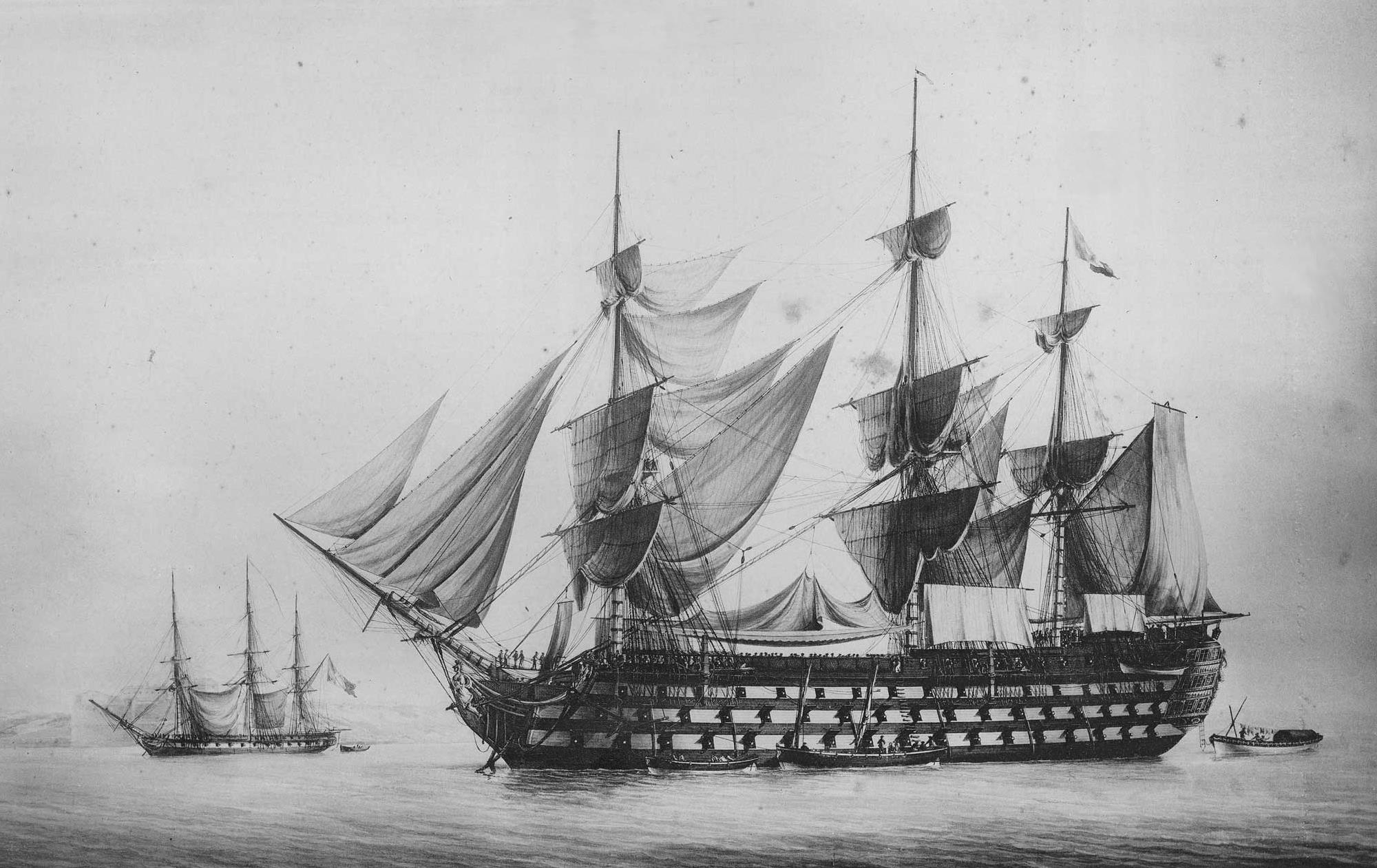
- Portrait of Wagram by François Roux

History

France
- Name: Wagram
- Namesake: Battle of Wagram
- Launched: 1 July 1810
- Commissioned: 1810
- Fate: Broken up, 1836

General characteristics
- Class & type: Océan-class ship of the line
- Displacement: 5,095 tonneaux
- Tons burthen: 2,794–2,930 port tonneaux
- Length: 63.83 m (209 ft 5 in) (gun deck)
- Beam: 16.4 m (53 ft 10 in)
- Draught: 8.14 m (26 ft 8 in)
- Depth: 8.12 m (26 ft 8 in)
- Propulsion: sail, 3,250 m^{2} (35,000 sq ft)
- Sail plan: full-rigged ship
- Complement: 1,130
- Armament: Lower gun deck:: 32 × 36 pdr guns; Middle gun deck: 34 × 24 pdr guns; Upper gun deck: 34 × 18 pdr guns; Forecastle & quarterdeck: 14 × 8 pdr guns + 12 × 36 pdr carronades

Wagram was a first-rate 118-gun Océan-class ship of the line built for the French Navy during the 1810s. Completed in 1811, the ship participated in the Action of 5 November 1813 during the Napoleonic Wars. She was refitted in 1818–1822, but was never recommissioned afterward.

== Description ==
The later Océan-class ships had a length of 63.83 metres (209 ft 5 in) at the gun deck a beam of 16.4 metres (53 ft 10 in) and a depth of hold of 8.12 metres (26 ft 8 in). The ships displaced 5095 tonneaux and had a mean draught of 8.14 metres (26 ft 8 in). They had a tonnage of 2,794–2,930 port tonneaux. Their crew numbered 1,130 officers and ratings. They were fitted with three masts and ship rigged with a sail area of 3,250 square metres (35,000 sq ft).

The muzzle-loading, smoothbore armament of the Océan class consisted of thirty-two 36-pounder long guns on the lower gun deck, thirty-four 24-pounder long guns on the middle gun deck and on the upper gundeck were thirty-four 18-pounder long guns. On the quarterdeck and forecastle were a total of fourteen 8-pounder long guns and a dozen 36-pounder carronades.

== Construction and career ==
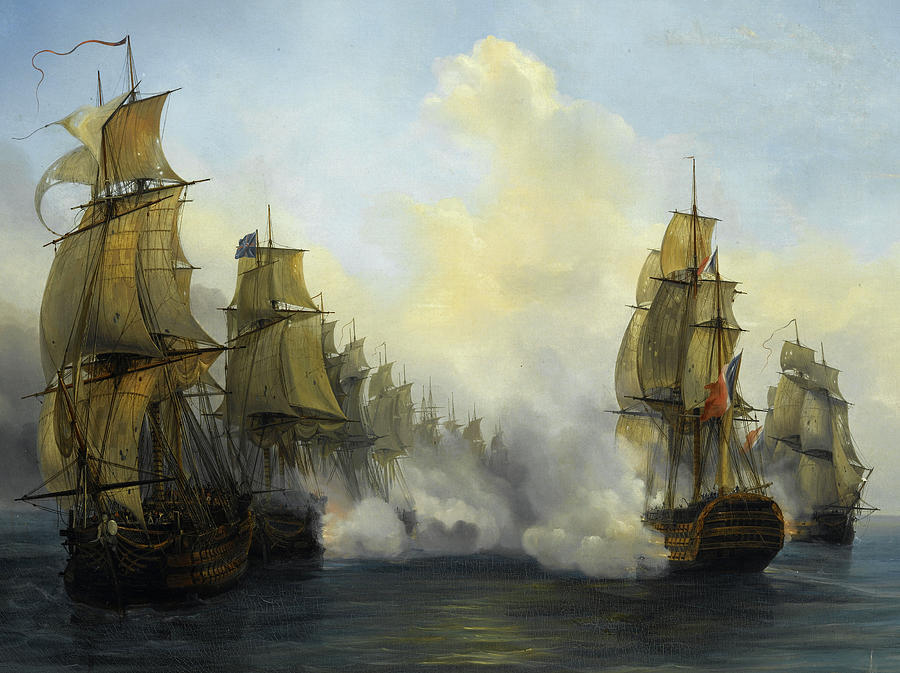
Fight of the Wagram in the Action of 5 November 1813, by Auguste Mayer

Wagram was ordered in 1809 as Monarque and was laid down at the Arsenal de Toulon in April. Renamed Wagram on 15 February 1810, the ship was launched on 1 July, commissioned on 11 February 1811 and completed the following month. Under Captain François Legras, she took part in the Action of 5 November 1813 as the flagship of Rear-Admiral Cosmao. On 29 August 1814, after the Hundred Days, Wagram was transferred from Toulon to Brest, along with Austerlitz and Commerce de Paris.

The ship had a lengthy refit in 1818–1821 and was never recommissioned afterward. She was struck from the navy list on 15 October 1836 and broken up the following year.
