= Souverain-class ship of the line =

French ship class

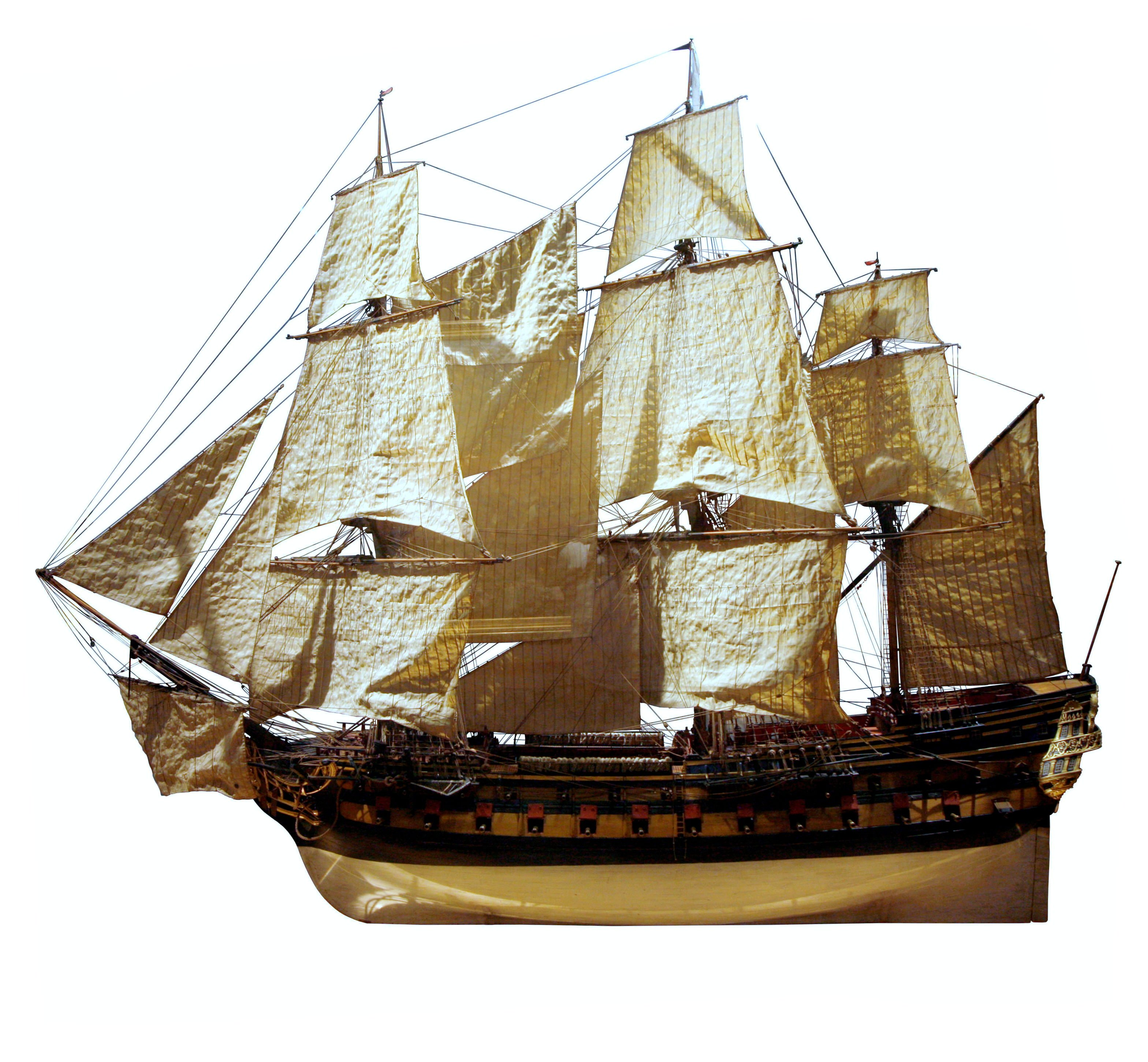
- Scale model of Protecteur on display at the Musée de la Marine in Paris. This model is a 64-gun, probably mislabeled.

Class overview
- Name: Souverain class
- Builders: Toulon
- Operators: French Navy
- Completed: 2

General characteristics
- Type: Ship of the line
- Displacement: 2800 tonneaux
- Tons burthen: 1536 port tonneaux
- Length: 54.6 m (179 ft 2 in)
- Beam: 14.3 m (46 ft 11 in)
- Draught: 7 m (23 ft 0 in)
- Propulsion: Sail
- Armament: 74 guns
- Armour: Timber

The Souverain class was a type of two 74-gun ships of the line.

== Ships ==
- Souverain

Builder: Toulon
Ordered: 25 October 1755
Launched: December 1757
Fate: Captured by the British after the Battle of the Nile, 2 August 1798.

- Protecteur

Builder: Toulon
Ordered: 29 May 1757
Launched: 22 May 1760
Fate: Hulked in 1784
