= French ship Protecteur =

Ship of the line of the French Navy

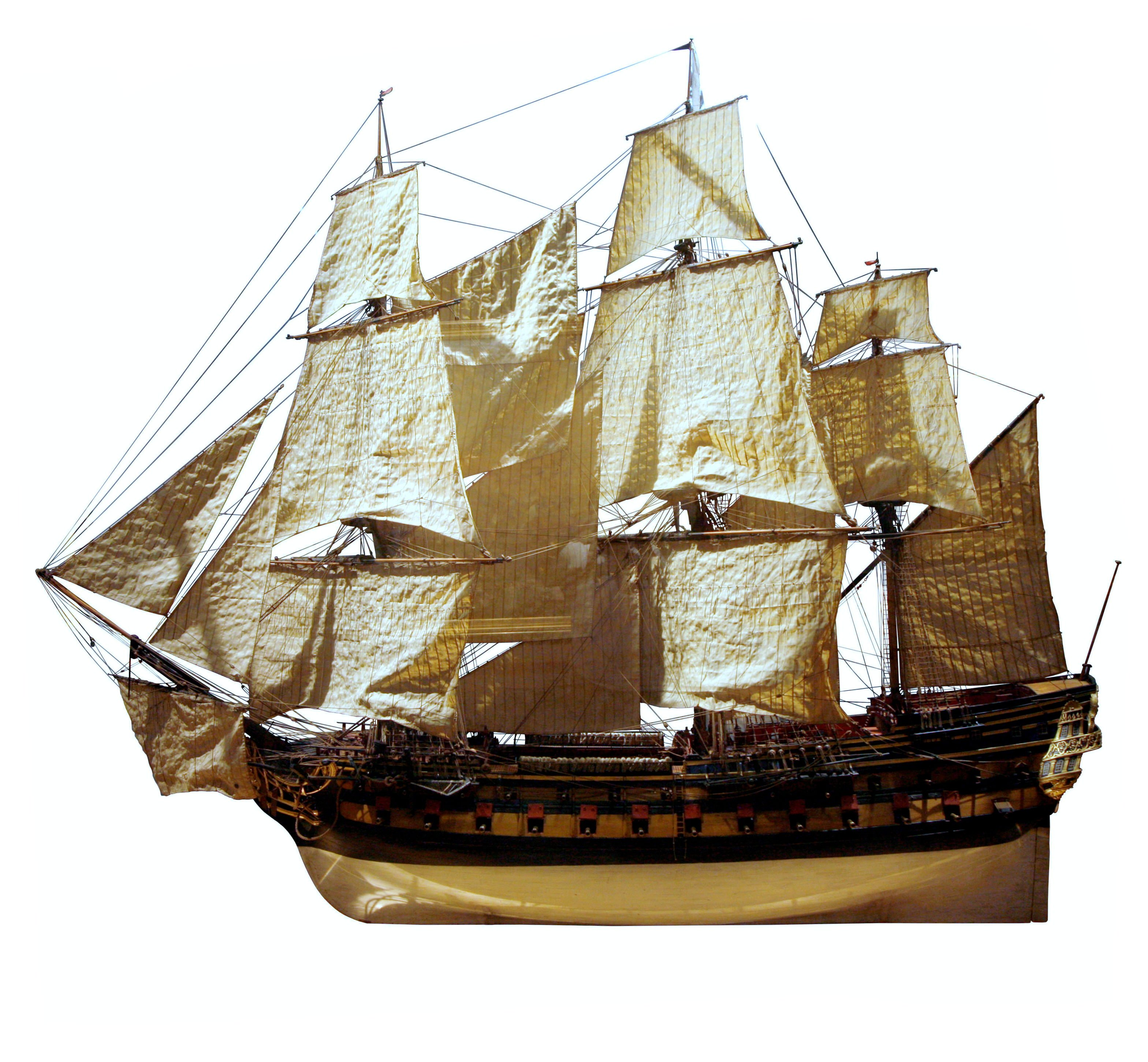
- Scale model on display at the Musée de la Marine in Paris. This model is a 64-gun, probably mislabeled.

History

France
- Name: Protecteur
- Namesake: "Protector"
- Builder: Toulon, by plans by Noël Pomet
- Laid down: 29 May 1757
- Launched: 22 May 1760
- Decommissioned: 1784
- Fate: Hulked 1784

General characteristics
- Class & type: Souverain-class 74-gun ship of the line
- Displacement: 2800 tonneaux
- Tons burthen: 1536 port tonneaux
- Length: 53.3 m (174 ft 10 in)
- Beam: 14.1 m (46 ft 3 in)
- Height: 7.1 m (23 ft 4 in)
- Complement: 410 men

Protecteur was a Souverain-class 74-gun ship of the line of the French Navy, the only to have borne the name.

== Career ==
She was laid down in 1757 and launched in 1760.

In 1762, under Captain de L'Ilsle Calian, Protecteur was part of Bompart's squadron. In 1766, she escorted merchantmen under Captain de Broves.

In 1788, Under Captain Dapchon, Protecteur was appointed to Admiral d'Estaing's squadron and took part in the American Revolutionary War. She took part in the Battle of Grenada under Grasse-Limermont.

In 1782, Protecteur was part of the escort of a 20-sail convoy, along with the ship Pégase and the frigates Indiscrète and Andromaque. The English HMS Foudroyant and HMS Queen intercepted, yielding the Third Battle of Ushant in which they captured Pégase and four transports, but where the rest of the French convoy escaped.

From 1784, Protecteur was hulked and used as a hospital in Rochefort.
