= French ship Friedland (1840) =

Ship of the line of the French Navy

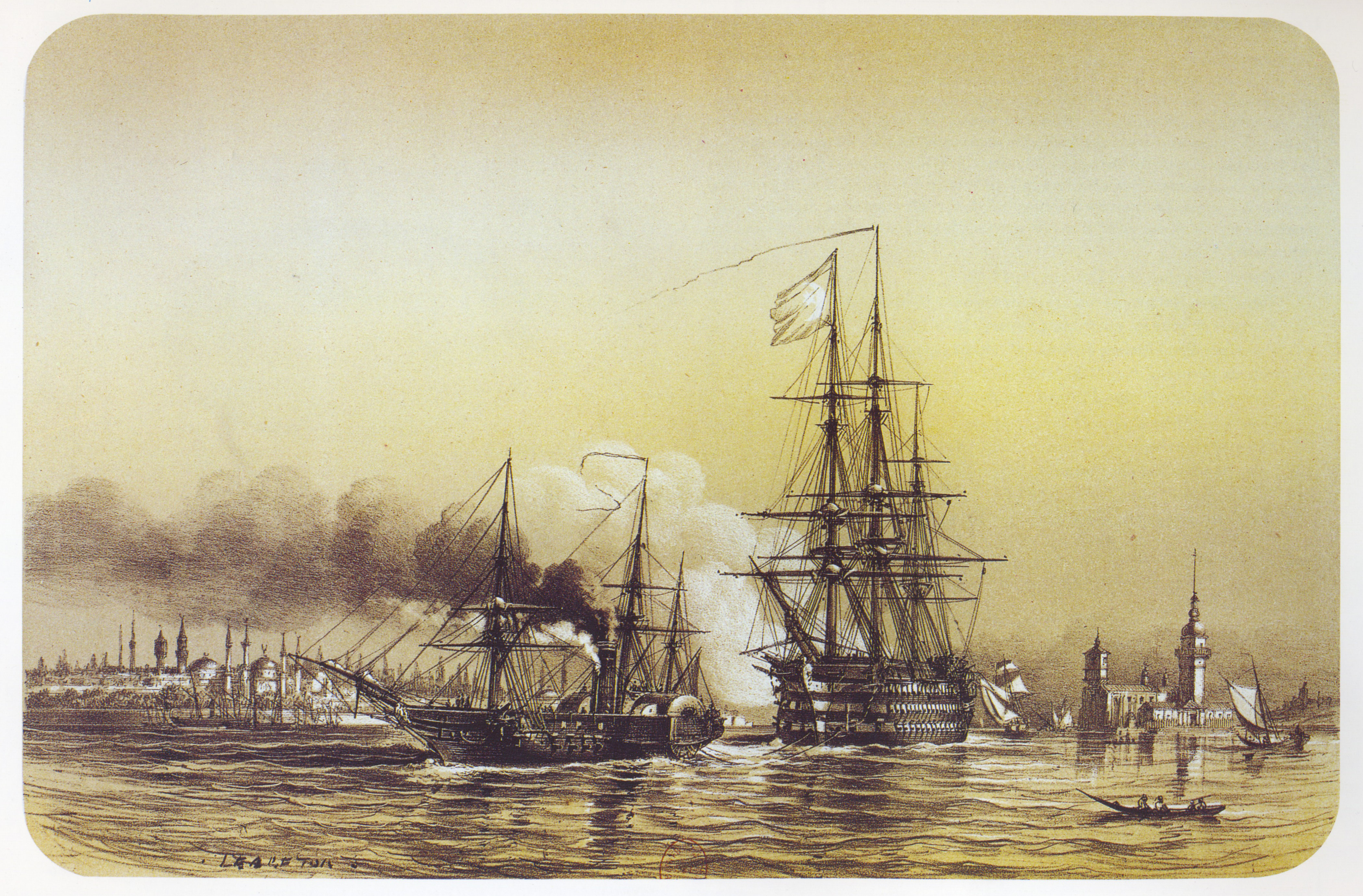
- Friedland in tow of a steamer, after she ran aground near Constantinople

History

France
- Name: Friedland
- Namesake: Battle of Friedland
- Builder: Cherbourg
- Laid down: 1 May 1812
- Launched: 4 March 1840
- Commissioned: 5 October 1840
- Stricken: 31 December 1864
- Fate: Broken up 1879

General characteristics
- Class & type: Océan-class ship of the line
- Displacement: 5,095 tonneaux
- Tons burthen: 2,794–2,930 port tonneaux
- Length: 63.83 m (209 ft 5 in) (gun deck)
- Beam: 16.4 m (53 ft 10 in)
- Draught: 8.14 m (26 ft 8 in)
- Depth of hold: 8.12 m (26 ft 8 in)
- Propulsion: sail, 3,250 m^{2} (35,000 sq ft)
- Sail plan: full-rigged ship
- Complement: 1,130
- Armament: Lower gun deck:: 32 × 36 pdr guns; Middle gun deck: 34 × 24 pdr guns; Upper gun deck: 34 × 18 pdr guns; Forecastle & quarterdeck: 14 × 8 pdr guns + 12 × 36 pdr carronades

Friedland was a first-rate 118-gun Océan-class ship of the line built for the French Navy during the 1810s. Completed in 1840, the ship did not play a significant role in the Crimean War of 1854–1855. She was proposed for conversion to steam power in 1857, but this was cancelled the following year.

== Description ==
The later Océan-class ships had a length of 63.83 metres (209 ft 5 in) at the gun deck a beam of 16.4 metres (53 ft 10 in) and a depth of hold of 8.12 metres (26 ft 8 in). The ships displaced 5095 tonneaux and had a mean draught of 8.14 metres (26 ft 8 in). They had a tonnage of 2,794–2,930 port tonneaux. Their crew numbered 1,130 officers and ratings. They were fitted with three masts and ship rigged with a sail area of 3,250 square metres (35,000 sq ft).

The muzzle-loading, smoothbore armament of the Océan class consisted of thirty-two 36-pounder long guns on the lower gun deck, thirty-four 24-pounder long guns on the middle gun deck and on the upper gundeck were thirty-four 18-pounder long guns. On the quarterdeck and forecastle were a total of fourteen 8-pounder long guns and a dozen 36-pounder carronades.

== Construction and career ==
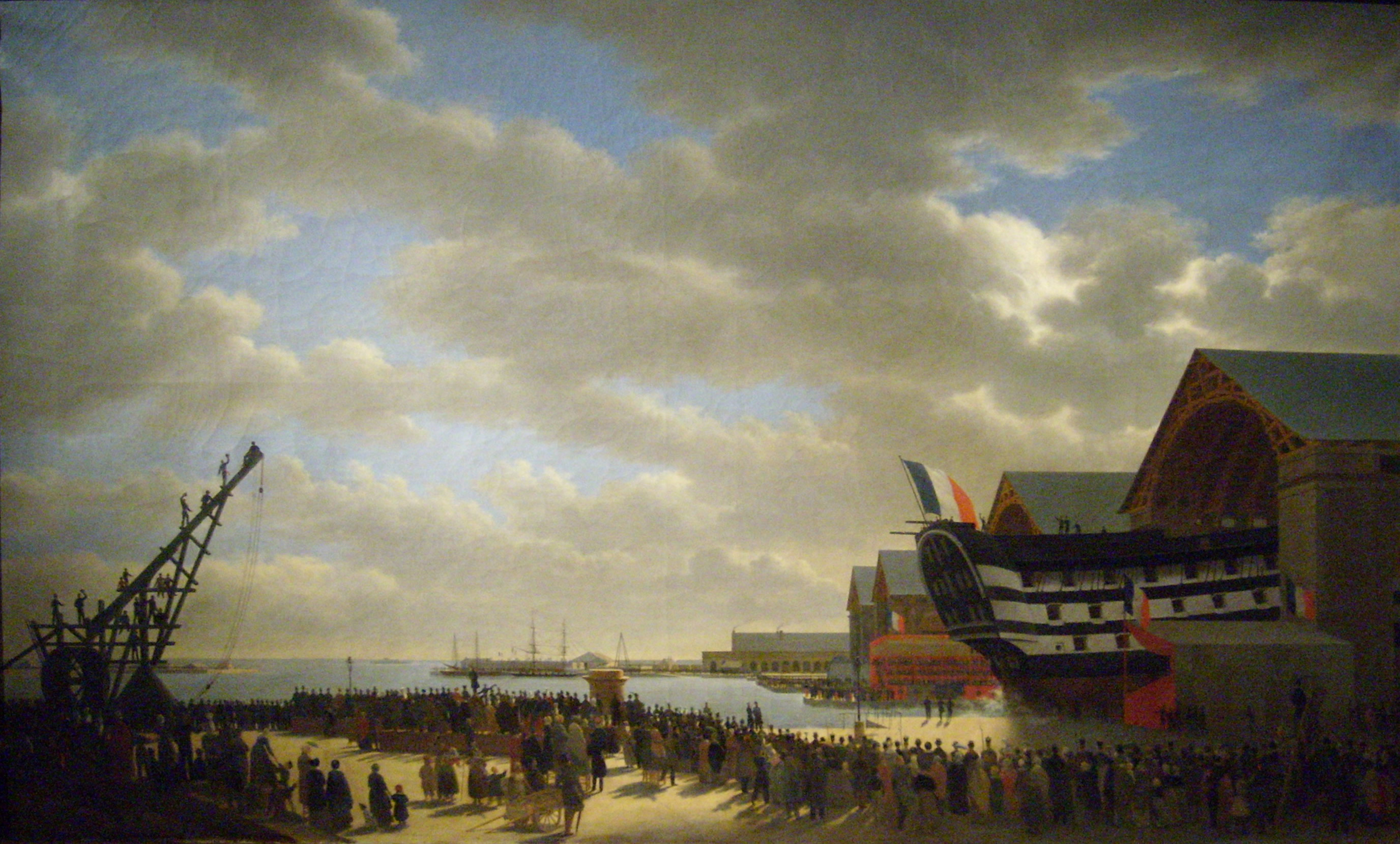
Launch of Friedland, by Antoine Chazal.

Friedland was ordered on 20 February 1812, laid down at the Arsenal de Cherbourg on 1 May and named Inflexible on 10 September. The ship was renamed Duc de Bordeaux on 19 December 1820. On 9 August 1830, following the July Revolution, she took her name of Friedland. The ship was launched on 4 April 1840, completed in August and commissioned on 5 October.

She was decommissioned from 1852 to 1853, when she was recommissioned and served in the Crimean War. On 27 July 1853, she ran aground off the Rabbit Islands, Ottoman Empire. She was later refloated. In 1857, work was undertaken to convert her to a steam and sail ship, but the conversion was aborted in February 1858 and the engine was eventually installed on Turenne.
