= Océan-class ship of the line =

Class of 118-gun ships of the line of the French Navy

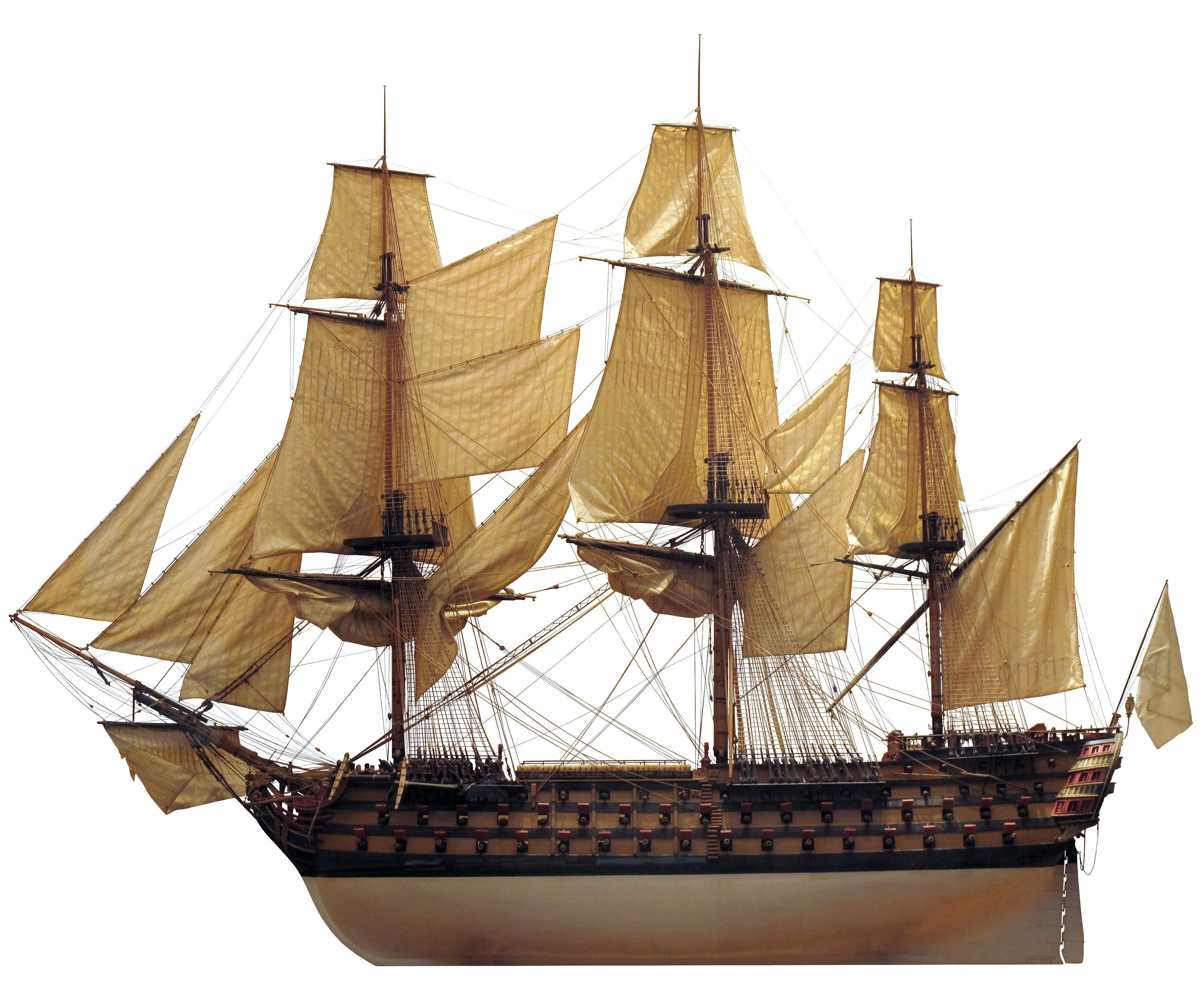
- Model of Commerce de Marseille

Class overview
- Name: Océan class
- Builders: Plans by Jacques-Noël Sané
- Operators: French Navy
- Preceded by: Bretagne
- Succeeded by: Commerce de Paris class
- Subclasses: Souverain class
- In commission: 1788–1882
- Planned: 20
- Completed: 15
- Canceled: 5

General characteristics
- Type: Ship of the line
- Displacement: 5,095 tonneaux
- Tons burthen: 2,794–2,930 port tonneaux
- Length: 65.18 m (213 ft 10 in) (196.6 French feet), Ville de Paris in 1858: 69.05 m (226 ft 7 in)
- Beam: 16.24 m (53 ft 3 in) (50 French feet)
- Draught: 8.12 m (26 ft 8 in) (25 French feet)
- Propulsion: sail, 3,265 m^{2} (35,140 sq ft)
- Speed: 10 knots (19 km/h; 12 mph)
- Complement: 1,079–1,130
- Armament: 124–136 guns in total: lower deck: 32 36-pound guns; middle deck: 34 24-pound guns; upper deck: 34 12-pound guns; (34 18-pound guns ships built after 1803); forecastle: 6 (Ocean: 4) 36-pound carronades; quarterdeck: 18 (Orient: 20, Austerlitz and later ships: 14) 8-pound guns, (Austerlitz and Montebello in 1834: 14 36-pound carronades)
- Armour: Timber

The Océan-class ships of the line were a series of 118-gun three-decker ships of the line of the French Navy, designed by the shipwright Jacques-Noël Sané. Fifteen were completed from 1788 on, with the last one entering service in 1854; a sixteenth was never completed, and four more were never laid down.

The first two of the series were Commerce de Marseille and États de Bourgogne in the late 1780s. Three ships to the same design followed during the 1790s (a further four ordered in 1793–94 were never built). A second group of eleven were ordered during the First Empire; sometimes described as the Austerlitz class after the first to be ordered, some of the later ships were not launched until after the end of the Napoleonic era, and one was not completed but broken up on the stocks. A 'reduced' (i.e. shortened) version of this design, called the Commerce de Paris class, with only 110 guns, was produced later, of which two examples were completed.

The 5,095-ton 118-gun type was the largest type of ship built up to then, besting the Spanish ship of the line Santísima Trinidad. Up to 1790 Great Britain, the largest of the battle fleet nations, had not built especially large battleships because the need for large numbers of ships had influenced its battleship policy. The French initiated a new phase in battleship competition when they laid down a large number of three-deckers of over 5,000 tons.

Along with the 74-gun of the Téméraire type and the 80-gun of the Tonnant type, the Océan 120-gun type was to become one of the three French standard types of battleships during the war period 1793 to 1815. These were the most powerful ships of the Napoleonic Wars and the History of ships of the line; a total of ten served during that time. These ships, however, were quite expensive in terms of building materials, artillery and manpower and so were reserved for admirals as their fleet flagships. Some of the ships spent 40 years on the stocks and were still in service in 1860, three of them having been equipped with auxiliary steam engines in the 1850s.

== Design ==
The design for the first 118-gun three-decker warships originated in 1782 with a design prepared by the shipwright Antoine Groignard. Carrying an extra pair of cannon on each deck (including the quarterdeck), this raised the firepower of these capital ships from 110 to 118 guns, including an unprecedented thirty-two 36-pounder guns in the lowest tier. The French Navy ordered two of these, to be built at Toulon and at Brest, the shipwright entrusted with the construction of the latter ship being Jacques-Noël Sané. However, with the onset of peace following the conclusion of the American War of Independence, these two ships were cancelled in 1783, along with several others. The concept was revived in 1785 when Sané, in conjunction with Jean-Charles de Borda, developed the design of Commerce de Marseille, marking a leap in the evolution of ship of the line design, when the first two ships were re-ordered at Toulon and Brest. The hull was simple with straight horizontal lines, minimal ornaments, and tumblehome. The poop deck was almost integral the gunwale, and the forecastle was minimal.

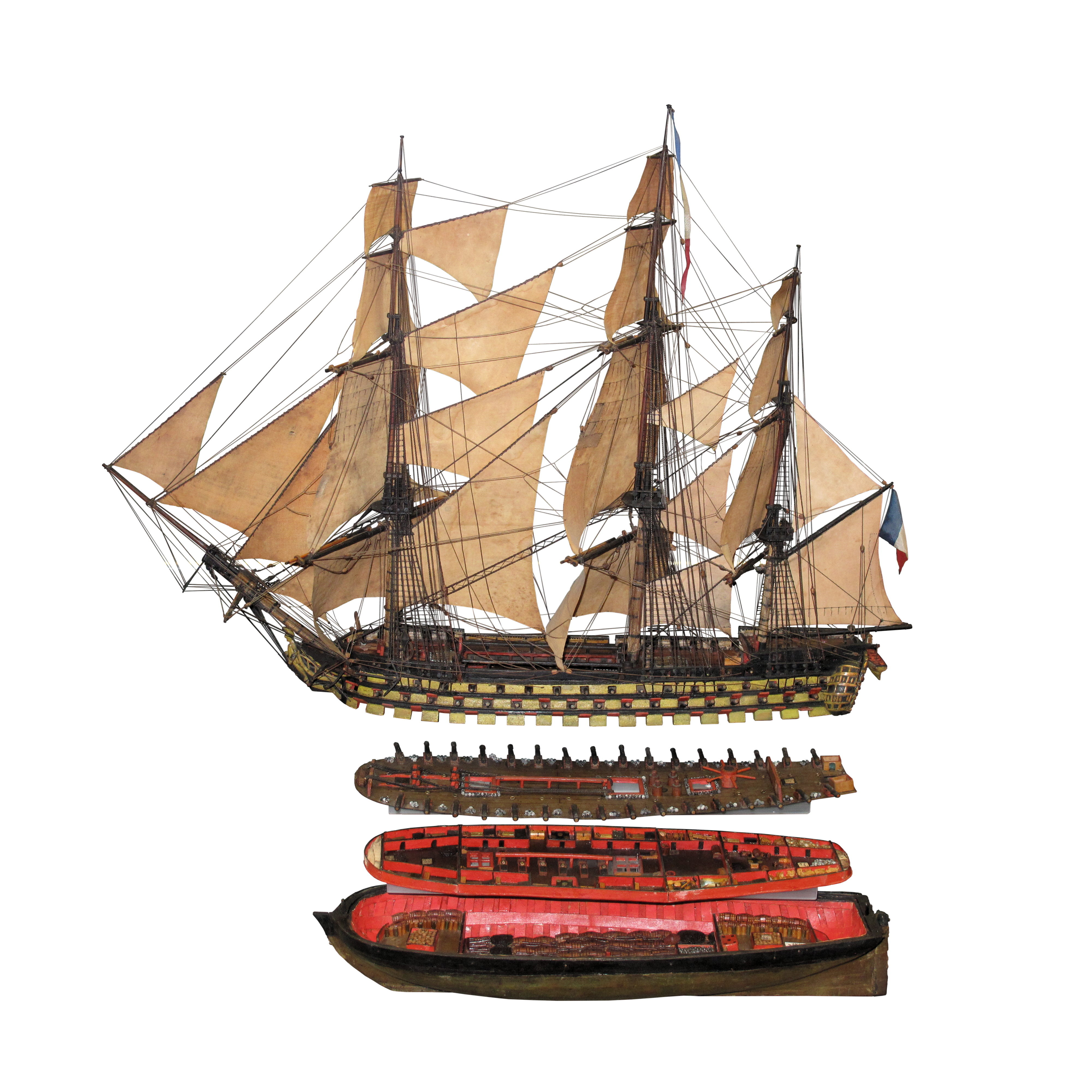
Scale model of an Océan-class ship, including the inner disposition of the lower decks, on display at the Swiss Museum of Transport in Lucerne.

They were highly successful as gun platforms and sailers, a fact which indicates that great improvements had been made in warship design since the late 17th century when battleships of less than half their size were regarded as unwieldy giants which ought to be brought into harbour before the September gales began. However, at least the first two of this class appear to have had less strength than necessary - one (Commerce de Marseille) which was taken by the British in 1793, was never used by them, and the other (by now renamed Ocean) had to be extensively rebuilt after a decade. This indicates that the growth in size of wooden warships caused structural problems which only gradually were solved.

Although these ships were costly, their design changed to become even larger in terms of overall tonnage with the introduction of a second (modified) group in 1806. Mounting 18-pounder cannon on her third gun deck (unheard of in French three-decked ships of the period), Austerlitz set the example for all of the French 118-gun ships to follow.

== Ships of the first group ==
(listed under their names at time of launching, and in order of their launching dates)

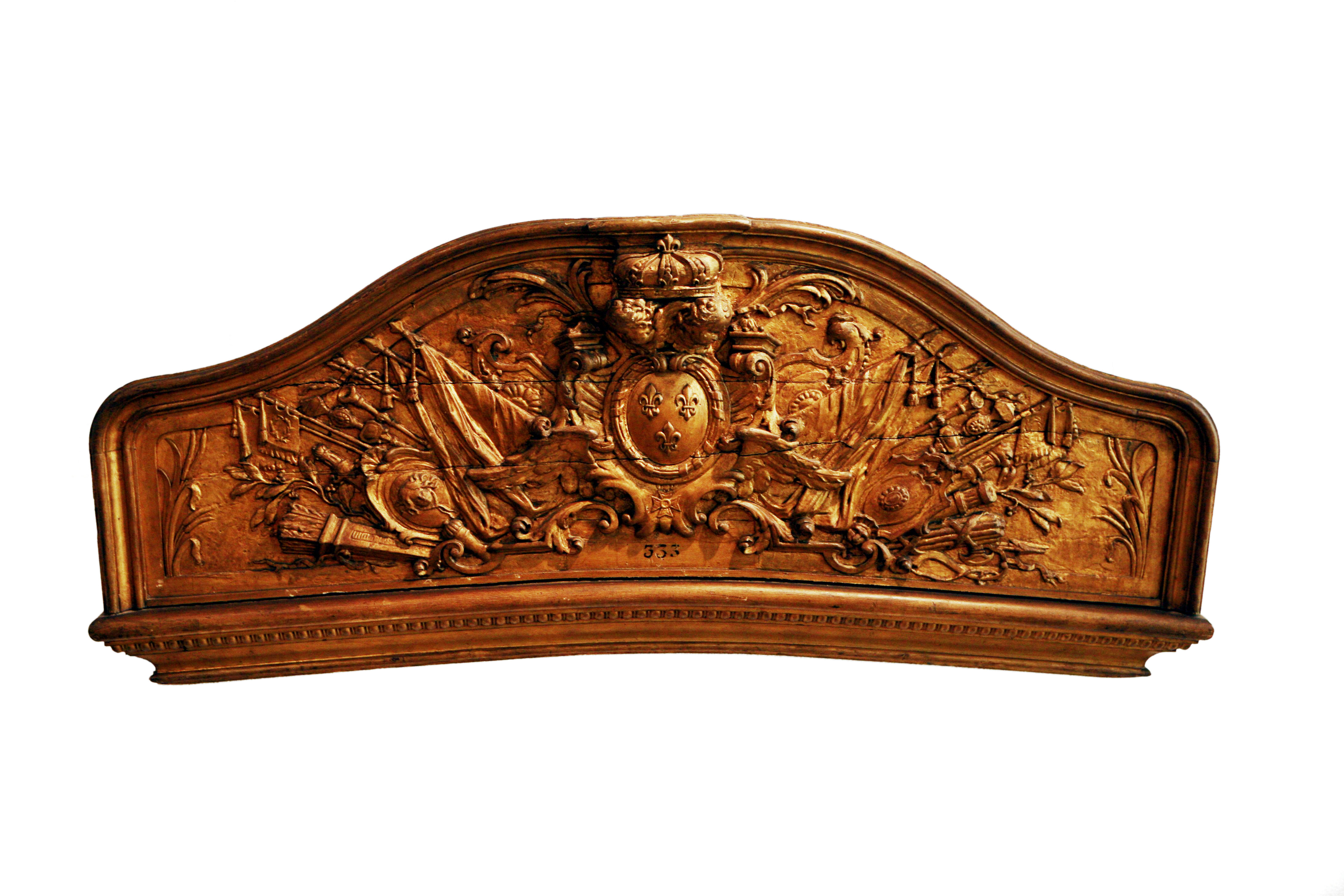
Aft panel of Souverain, on display at Toulon naval museum.

- Commerce de Marseille

Builder: Toulon
Ordered: 1786
Laid down: September 1786 or April 1787
Launched: 7 August 1788
Completed: October 1790
Fate: captured by the British in Toulon on 29 August 1793 and commissioned into the Royal Navy as HMS Commerce de Marseille. Converted to a floating prison in February 1799, and scrapped in 1802.

- États de Bourgogne

Builder: Brest
Ordered: 30 September 1785
Laid down: 12 August 1786 as États de Bourgogne
Launched: 8 November 1790
Completed: December 1790
Fate: renamed Montagne on 22 October 1793 and then Peuple on 25 May 1795 and Océan on 30 May 1795, disarmed in 1854 and stricken in 1855.

- Dauphin Royal

Builder: Toulon
Ordered: 21 November 1789
Laid down: May 1790 as Dauphin Royal
Launched: 20 July 1791
Completed: August 1793
Fate: renamed Sans Culotte on 29 September 1792 and then Orient on 21 May 1795; blew up at the Battle of the Nile on 1 August 1798.

- Majestueux

Builder: Rochefort
Ordered: 1793
Laid down: 1794 as République française (renamed February 1803)
Launched: 1802
Completed: August, 1803
Fate: Scrapped in 1839

- Vengeur

Builder: Brest
Ordered: 1793
Laid down: 17 October 1793 as Peuple, renamed to Vengeur in July 1794.
Launched: 1 October 1803.
Completed: February 1804.
Fate: Renamed Impérial on 7 March 1805. Grounded and captured by the British during the Battle of San Domingo on 6 February 1806 and destroyed by fire.

- Four further ships of this class were ordered, two in 1793 at Toulon (to be named Fleurus and probably Quatorze Juillet) and two in 1794 at Brest (Liberté des Mers) and Rochefort (Républicain) respectively, but were never proceeded with.

== Ships of the second (modified) group ==
(listed under their names at time of launching, and in order of their launching dates) Although these constituted a second batch of the Océan class, built to the same dimensions, the design was modified and they had a heavier displacement, and were often referred to as the Austerlitz class.

- Austerlitz: ordered on 19 December 1805 and laid down on 10 April 1806 at Toulon; launched 15 August 1808 and completed August 1809. Never commissioned after her refit of 1821–822, and broken up in 1837.
- Ville-de-Paris: ordered on 19 July 1806 and laid down in May 1808 at Rochefort as Marengo; renamed to Ville-de-Vienne in 1807, Comte-d'Artois on 8 July 1814, and Ville-de-Paris on 9 August 1830. Launched in 1850. Entered Service in July, 1851. Converted to a dual sail/steam ship in 1858, engine removed and converted to transport in 1870. Stricken in 1882; hulk used as floating barracks until scrapped in 1898.
- Wagram: ordered in early 1809 and laid down April 1809 as Monarque at Toulon; renamed Wagram on 15 February 1810; launched 1 July 1810 and completed March 1811. Scrapped in 1836.
- Impérial: ordered on 4 June 1810 and laid down on 2 July 1810 at Toulon; launched 1 December 1811 and completed in August 1812, renamed to Royal Louis on 9 April 1814, reverted to Impérial on 22 March 1815 and then again to Royal Louis on 15 July 1815, condemned 1825 at Toulon and scrapped.

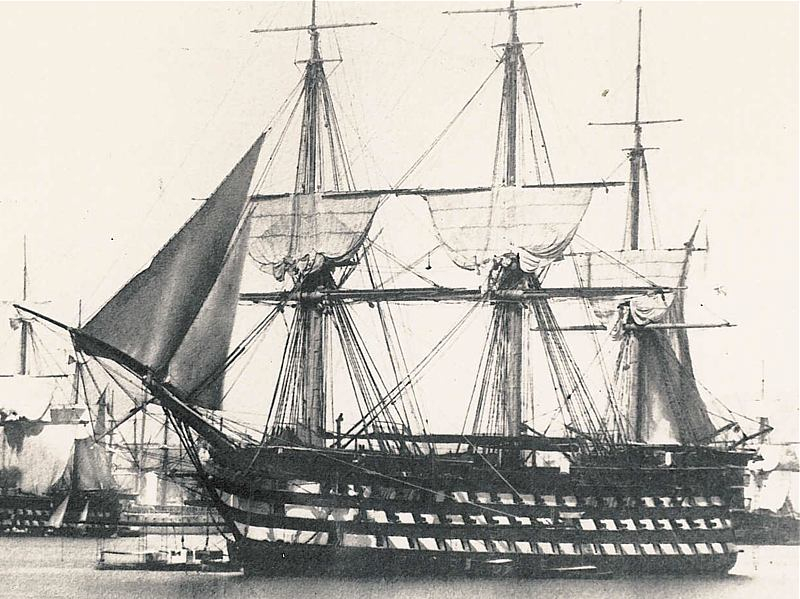
Montebello, circa 1850

- Montebello: ordered in 1810 and laid down in October 1810 at Toulon, launched on 6 December 1812 and completed in August 1813. Transferred to the gunnery school in 1860 and to the navigation school in 1865. Stricken in 1867. Scrapped in 1889.
- Louis XIV: ordered in early 1811 and laid down as Tonnant in April 1811 at Rochefort; renamed to Louis XIV in 1828, launched on 28 February 1854. Entered service in 1854. Converted to a dual sail/steam ship in 1857. Transferred to the gunnery training school in 1861. Out of service 1873, stricken in 1880, scrapped in 1882.
- Sans Pareil: ordered on 15 March 1811 and laid down as Sans Pareil in April 1811 at Brest. Renamed Roi de Rome in early 1812, then Inflexible on 21 May 1812 and finally reverted to Sans Pareil on 21 December 1812. Cancelled and broken up on the ways in June 1816 without having been launched.
- Héros: ordered on 20 February 1812 and laid down in April 1812 at Toulon; launched on 15 August 1813 and completed in January 1814, but never commissioned. Scrapped in 1828.
- Friedland: ordered on 20 February 1812 and laid down at Cherbourg as Inflexible on 1 May 1812, renamed Duc de Bordeaux on 19 December 1820 and then Friedland on 9 August 1830. Launched on 4 April 1840. Entered service on 5 October 1840. Conversion to dual sail/steam ship started in 1857 but was abandoned and ship was laid up without engine in 1858. Stricken in 1864. Hulk renamed Colosse in 1865 and scrapped in 1879.
- Souverain: ordered on 20 March 1813 and laid down at Toulon in April 1813, launched on 25 August 1819. Converted to sail/steam and entered service in 1857. Used as gunnery training vessel from 1860. Stricken in 1867. Hulk scrapped in 1905.
- Trocadéro: ordered on 20 March 1813 and laid down in September 1813 at Toulon as Formidable, renamed to Trocadéro in 1823, launched on 14 April 1824 and completed in October 1824 but never commissioned. Destroyed in an accidental fire on 4 March 1836.

== Bibliography ==
- "Le vaisseau trois-ponts l’Océan", Jean Boudriot, in Neptunia n° 102 (1971), page 21.
- Demerliac, Alain (2004). La Marine de Louis XVI: Nomenclature des Navires Français de 1774 à 1792 (in French). Éditions Ancre. ISBN 2-906381-23-3.
- Demerliac, Alain (2004). La Marine de la Révolution: Nomenclature des Navires Français de 1792 à 1799 (in French). Éditions Ancre. ISBN 2-906381-24-1.
- Demerliac, Alain (2004). La Marine du Consulat et du Premier Empire: Nomenclature des Navires Français de 1800 à 1815 (in French). Éditions Ancre. ISBN 2-903179-30-1.
- Demerliac, Alain (2004). La Marine de la Restauration et du Louis-Phillipe 1er: Nomenclature des Navires Français de 1815 à 1848 (in French). Éditions Ancre. ISBN 2-906381-23-3.
- Demerliac, Alain (2004). La Marine de la Deuxième République et du Second Empire: Nomenclature des Navires Français de 1848 à 1871 (in French). Éditions Ancre. ISBN 2-906381-23-3.
- Roche, Jean-Michel (2005). Dictionnaire des bâtiments de la flotte de guerre française de Colbert à nos jours. Vol. 1. Group Retozel-Maury Millau. ISBN 978-2-9525917-0-6. OCLC 165892922. (1671-1870)
- Winfield, Rif and Roberts, Stephen (2015) French Warships in the Age of Sail 1786-1861: Design, Construction, Careers and Fates. Seaforth Publishing. ISBN 978-1-84832-204-2.
