= French ship Commerce de Marseille (1788) =

Ship of the line of the French Navy

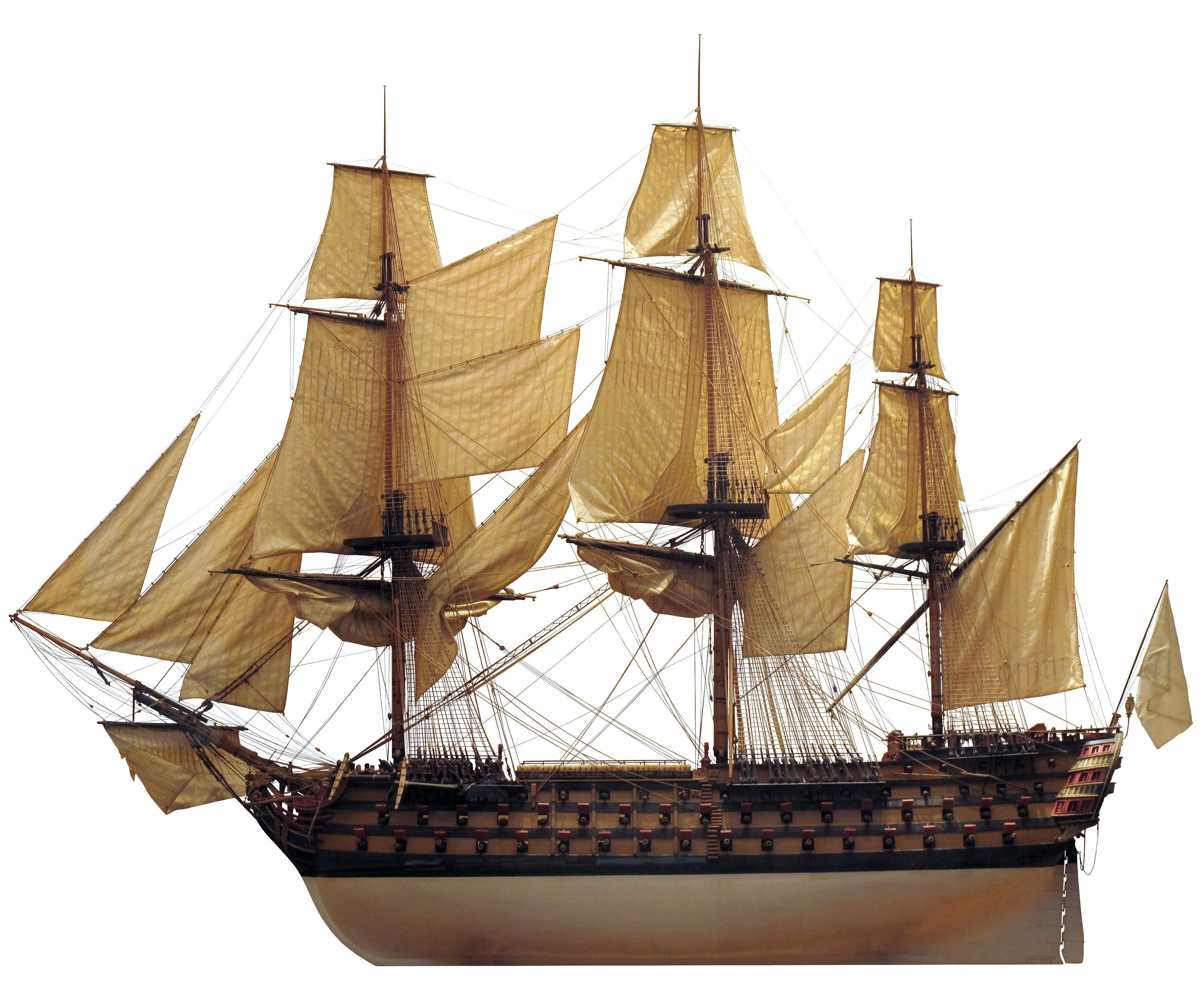
- Model of Commerce de Marseille

History

France
- Name: Commerce de Marseille
- Namesake: Marseille
- Ordered: 1786
- Builder: Arsenal de Toulon
- Laid down: September 1786 or April 1787
- Launched: 7 August 1788
- Completed: October 1790
- Stricken: 1802
- Captured: Seized as prize by Great Britain, 29 August 1793

United Kingdom
- Name: HMS Commerce de Marseille
- Fate: Scrapped, 1802

General characteristics
- Class & type: Océan-class ship of the line
- Displacement: 5,095 tonneaux
- Tons burthen: 2,794–2,930 port tonneaux
- Length: 63.83 m (209 ft 5 in) (gun deck)
- Beam: 16.24 m (53 ft 3 in)
- Draught: 8.15 m (26 ft 9 in)
- Depth of hold: 8.12 m (26 ft 8 in)
- Propulsion: sail, 3,250 m^{2} (35,000 sq ft)
- Sail plan: full-rigged ship
- Complement: 1,117
- Armament: Lower gun deck:: 32 × 36 pdr guns; Middle gun deck: 34 × 24 pdr guns; Upper gun deck: 34 × 12 pdr guns; Forecastle & quarterdeck: 18 × 8 pdr guns + 6 × 36 pdr obusiers

Commerce de Marseille was a 118-gun ship of the line of the French Navy, lead ship (Note: Commerce de Marseille was ordered after États de Bourgogne (which was later renamed Océan), but launched before her; therefore, the ship type is alternatively called Commerce de Marseille class or Océan class) of the Océan class. She was funded by a don des vaisseaux donation from the chamber of commerce of Marseille.

== Description ==
The Océan-class ships had a length of 63.83 metres (209 ft 5 in) at the gun deck a beam of 16.24 metres (53 ft 3 in) and a depth of hold of 8.12 metres (26 ft 8 in). The ships displaced 5095 tonneaux and had a mean draught of 8.15 metres (26 ft 9 in). They had a tonnage of 2,794–2,930 port tonneaux. Their crew numbered 1,117 officers and ratings. They were fitted with three masts and ship rigged with a sail area of 3,250 square metres (35,000 sq ft).

The muzzle-loading, smoothbore armament of the Océan class consisted of thirty-two 36-pounder long guns on the lower gun deck, thirty-four 24-pounder long guns on the middle gun deck and on the upper gundeck were thirty-four 12-pounder long guns. On the quarterdeck and forecastle were a total of eighteen 8-pounder long guns and six 30-pounder obusiers.

== Career ==
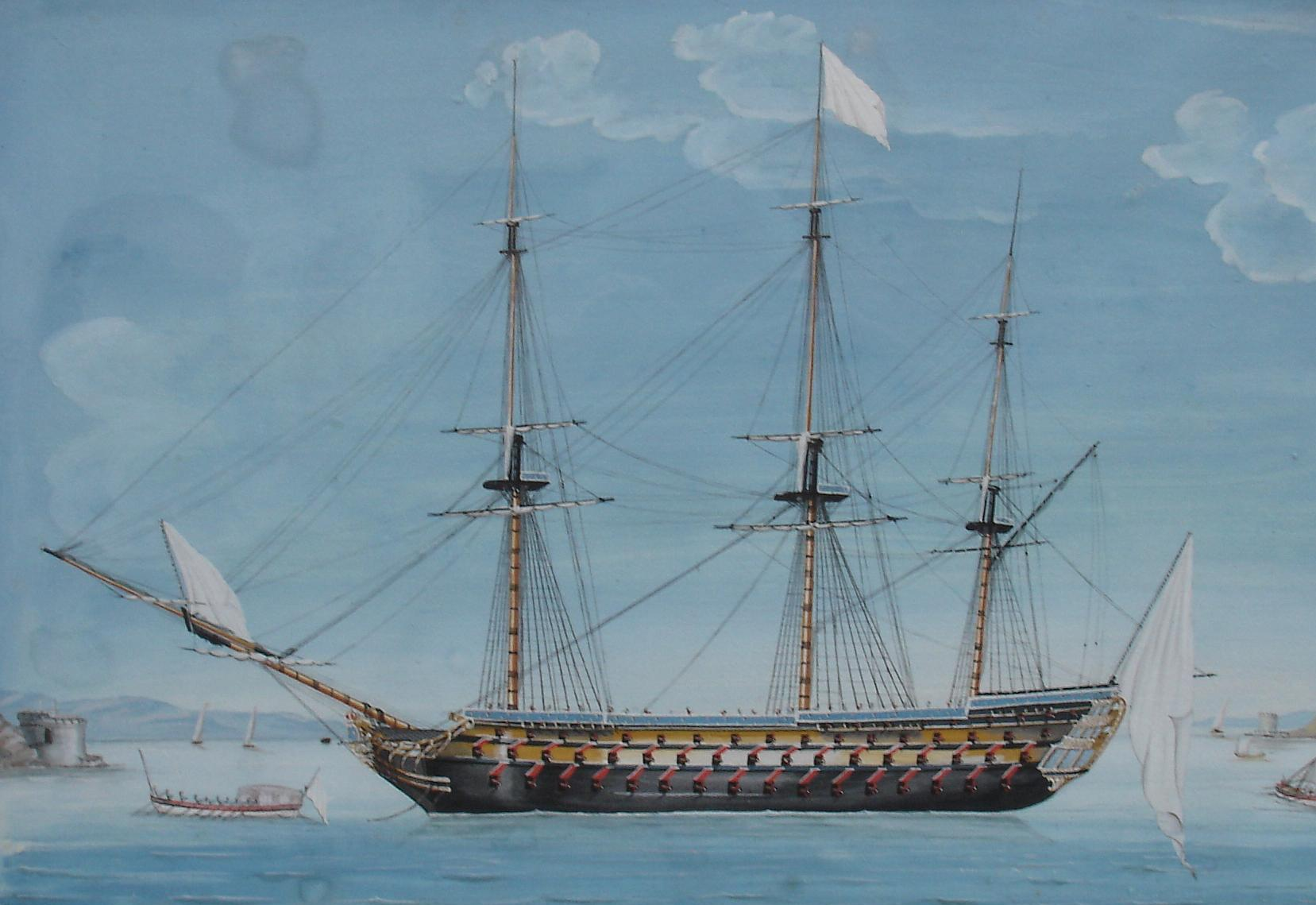
1788 painting of Commerce de Marseille at Toulon

Commerce de Marseille was laid down at the Arsenal de Toulon in September 1786, launched on 7 August 1788 and completed in October 1790. Built with state-of-the-art plans by Jacques-Noël Sané, she was dubbed the "finest ship of the century". Her construction was difficult because of a lack of wood, and soon after her completion, she was disarmed in 18 December 1793. The ship came under British control during the Siege of Toulon on 29 August 1793. When the city fell to the French in December, she evacuated the harbour for Portsmouth. She was briefly used as a stores ship, but on a journey to the Caribbean Sea, in 1795, she was badly damaged in a storm and had to limp back to Portsmouth. She remained there as a hulk until she was broken up in February 1802.
