= 8-pounder long gun =

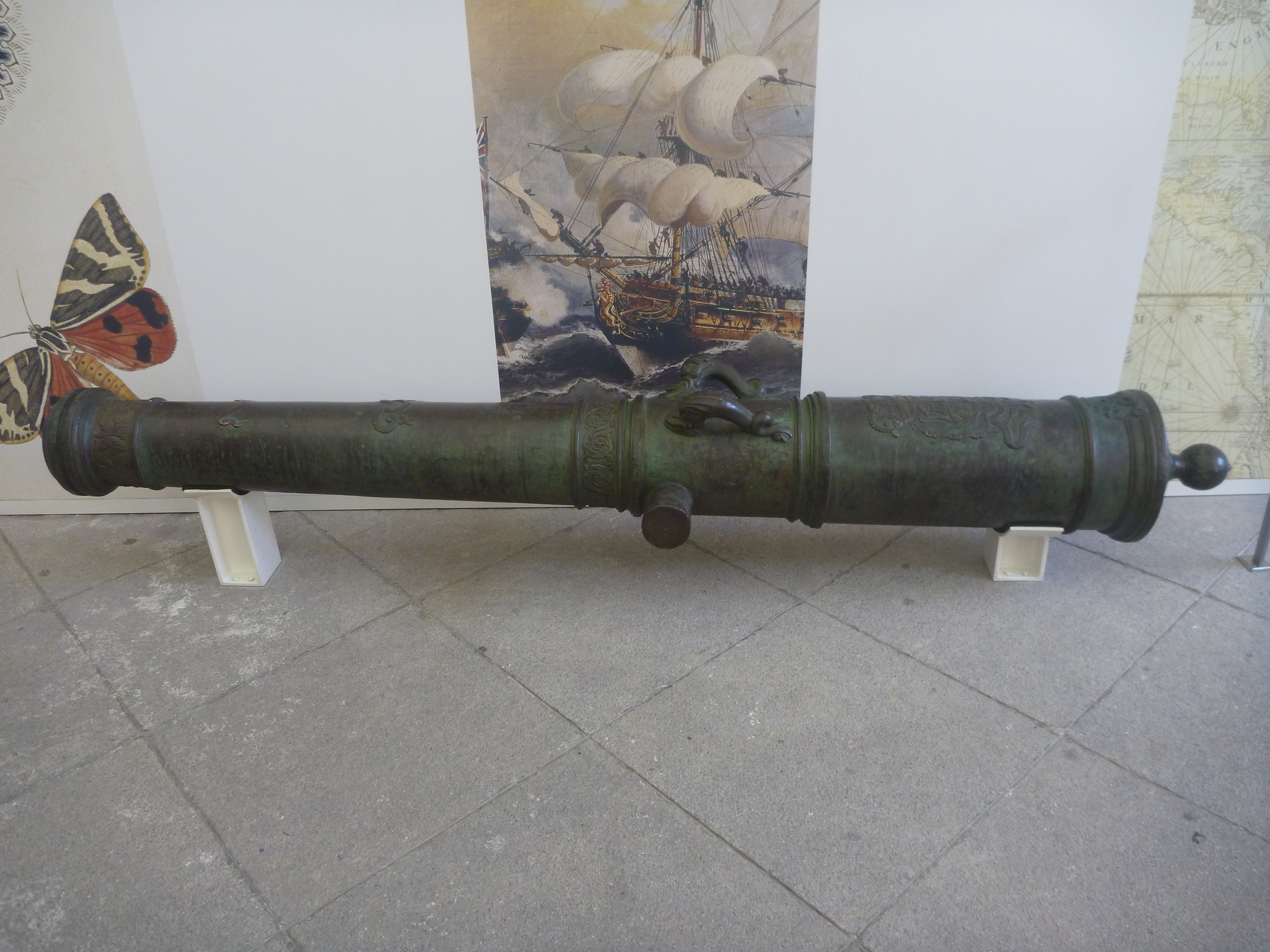
- An 8-pounder long gun made in Sevilla in 1754
- Type: naval gun

Service history
- Used by: France, Spain, Great Britain, Holland, Sweden, United States

Specifications
- Mass: 1120 kg 215 kg (mount)
- Barrel length: approx. 2 metres
- Shell weight: 3.6 kg

The 8-pounder long gun was a light calibre piece of artillery mounted on French warships of the Age of Sail. It fired a projectile of eight livres in weight, equivalent to 8.633 English pounds, or 8 lb 10 oz (the French livre was 7.916% heavier than the English pound weight). They were used as chase guns or main guns on light ships of the early 19th century, and on the quarterdeck and forecastle of ships of the line. They were similar in design to the Canon de 8 Gribeauval.

== Usage ==
The 8-pounder was the heaviest of the light guns. Its light weight allowed it to be mounted on the upper gun posts of ships of the line, where the timber of the deck was too light to support larger guns; furthermore, it could be mounted relatively high without jeopardy to the stability of the ship, and could be installed at will at different positions. This made it useful as a chase gun, since its load packed enough power to damage the rigging of a fleeing enemy (if used as a bow chaser) or of a pursuing enemy (when used as a stern chaser).

== Sources and references ==
- (in French) Jean Boudriot et Hubert Berti, L'Artillerie de mer : marine française 1650-1850, Paris, éditions Ancre, 1992 (ISBN 2-903179-12-3) (notice BNF no FRBNF355550752).
- (in French) Jean Peter, L'artillerie et les fonderies de la marine sous Louis XIV, Paris, Economica, 1995, 213 p. (ISBN 2-7178-2885-0).
