= T. superba =

T. superba may refer to:

- Terminalia superba, the superb terminalia, limba, afara or korina, a large tree species native to tropical western Africa
- Tillandsia superba, a plant species native to Bolivia and Ecuador

== See also ==
- Superba (disambiguation)
