= Ougeotte =

River in eastern France

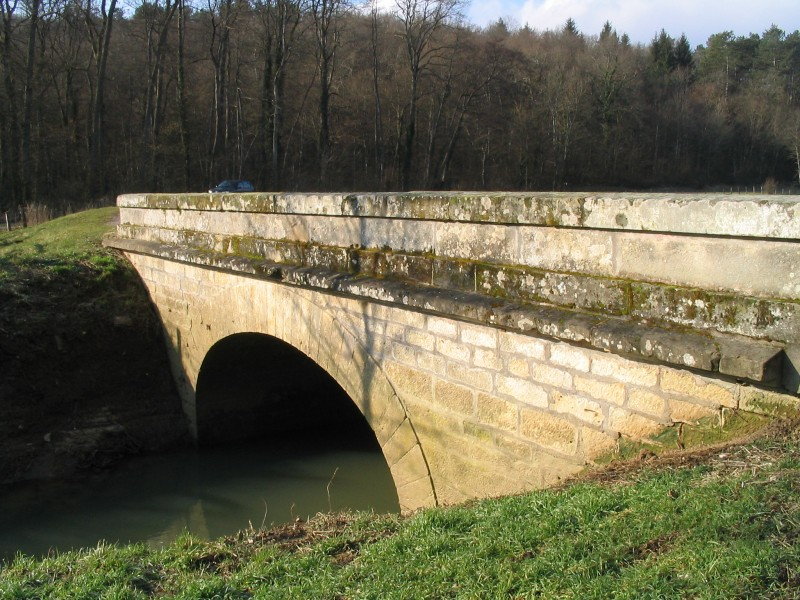
- The "pont aux oies" (goose bridge) at Montigny-lès-Cherlieu

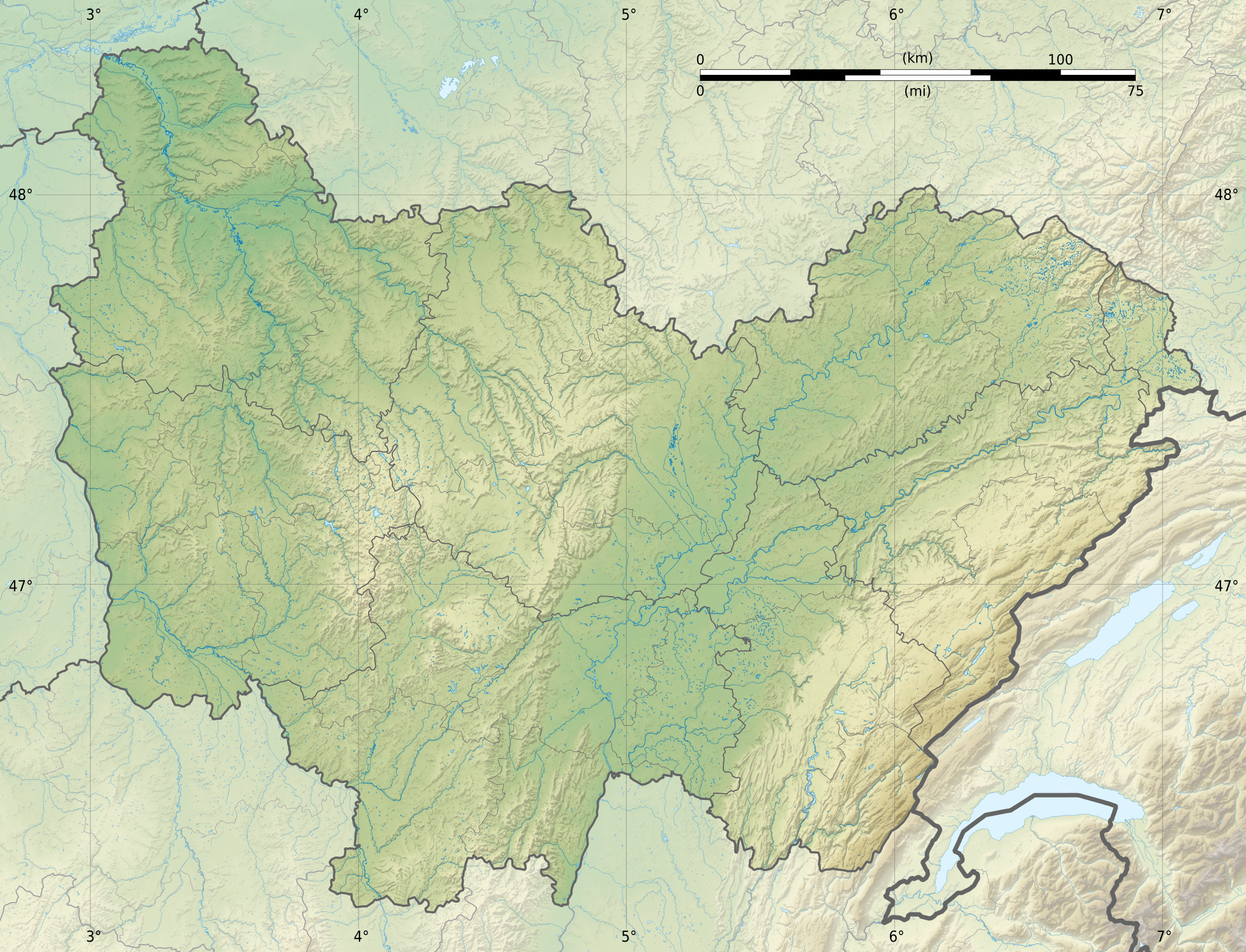
- Location within France Location within Bourgogne-Franche-Comté

Location
- Country: France
- Region: Bourgogne-Franche-Comté
- Department: Haute-Saône

Physical characteristics
- Source
  - location: Ouge
  - coordinates: 47.7773°N 5.687°E
- Mouth: Saône
  - location: Gevigney-et-Mercey
  - coordinates: 47.8168°N 5.9696°E
- Length: 27.3 km (17.0 mi)
- Discharge
  - average: 1 m^{3}/s (35 cu ft/s)

Basin features
- Progression: Saône→ Rhône→ Mediterranean Sea

The Ougeotte (French pronunciation: [uʒɔt]) is a 27.3 km (17.0 mi) river in the department of Haute-Saône in the region of Bourgogne-Franche-Comté in eastern France. It is a sub-tributary of the Rhône via the Saône.

== Geography ==
The Ougeotte rises in Ouge, which gives its name to the river. It flows generally east, receiving the Gailley at Chauvirey-le-Vieil, then the Écrevisses stream on the right of the ancient Agneaucourt mill, then joining the Saône at Gevigney-et-Mercey, near Montureux-lès-Baulay.

Nowadays there are no more mills which take power from the Ougeotte, while at the beginning of the 19th century there were many:

- Ouge: le Moulinot
- Chauvirey: le Bouvot, le Maublanc, la Guerelle, le Grand Moulin
- Montigny-lès-Cherlieu: Montigny, Agneaucourt, and on the tributary stream: le Ferry and le Battant
- Noroy
- Bougey: la Perrière
- Gevigney: Vachez, le Moulin Neuf
- Montureux-lès-Baulay

In the 1840s, the Ougeotte was populated by burbot, pike, eel and perch. By 1960, it was fished for trout and crayfish.

== See also ==
- List of rivers of France
