= Superbe =

Superbe, a French word meaning "superb", may refer to:

- Superbe (river), in Haute-Saône, France
- French ship Superbe, several ships

== See also ==
- Superb (disambiguation)
