= C. superbus =

C. superbus may refer to:

- Calochortus superbus, the superb mariposa lily, a flowering plant species
- Cyornis superbus, the Bornean blue-flycatcher, a bird species found in Brunei and Indonesia

== See also ==
- Superbus (disambiguation)
