= Thalie =

Thalie may refer to:

- Thalie (river), a tributary of the Saône in France
- Lynda Thalie, Canadian singer-songwriter
- Thalie Tremblay, Canadian fencer

== See also ==
- Thali (disambiguation)
- Thalia Awards (Czech: Ceny Thálie), annual acting awards
- Thalia (disambiguation)
