= Yellow mariposa =

Yellow mariposa is the common name for a couple of species of California mariposa lilies including:

- Calochortus luteus
- Calochortus superbus
