= Superbase (disambiguation) =

In chemistry, a superbase is a compound that has a particularly high affinity for protons.

Superbase may also refer to:

- Superbase (database), an end-user desktop program first associated with the Commodore 64 computer

Its homophone Superbass may refer to:

- SuperBass, a 1997 jazz album by Ray Brown, Christian McBride, and John Clayton
- "Super Bass", a 2010 song by Nicki Minaj

== See also ==
- Brooklyn Superbas, an earlier name of the American baseball team the Brooklyn Dodgers
- Superbus (disambiguation)
