= HMS Superb =

Eleven ships of the Royal Navy have borne the name HMS Superb, or HMS Superbe:

- HMS Superb (1710) was a 64-gun third rate, previously the French ship Superbe. She was captured by HMS Kent in 1710 and was broken up in 1732
- HMS Superb (1736) was 60-gun fourth rate launched in 1736 and broken up in 1757
- HMS Superb (1760) was a 74-gun third rate launched in 1760 and wrecked in 1783
- HMS Superbe (1795) was a 22-gun sixth rate. She was previously a French ship, captured in 1795 by HMS Vanguard and used as a prison ship from 1796. She was sold in 1798.
- HMS Superb (1798) was a 74-gun third rate, launched in 1798 and broken up in 1826
- HMS Superb (1842) was an 80-gun second rate, launched in 1842 and broken up in 1869
- HMS Superb was to have been a broadside ironclad battleship, but she was renamed HMS Alexandra in 1874 before being launched in 1875. She was sold in 1908.
- HMS Superb (1875) was a battleship launched in 1875. She was built for the Turkish Navy, and was to have been named Hamidiyeh. She was purchased by Britain in 1873 and was sold in 1906.
- HMS Superb (1907) was Bellerophon-class battleship launched in 1907, involved in the Occupation of Constantinople and sold in 1923
- HMS Superb (25) was a Minotaur-class light cruiser launched in 1943 and sold in 1960.
- HMS Superb (S109) was a Swiftsure-class nuclear-powered hunter killer submarine launched in 1974, and decommissioned on 26 September 2008 after sustaining damage in an underwater grounding in the Red Sea

== Battle honours ==
Ships named Superb have earned the following battle honours:

- Passero, 1718
- Sadras, 1782
- Providien, 1782
- Negapatam, 1782
- Trincomalee, 1782
- Gut of Gibraltar, 1801
- San Domingo, 1806
- Algiers, 1816
- Alexandria, 1882
- Jutland, 1916

== See also ==
- French ship Superbe
