= Superba =

Superba, a Latin adjective meaning superb, may refer to:

- SUPERBA TVP process, a process in heatsetting
- Checker Superba, an automobile produced between 1961 and 1963
- a variety of Persicaria bistorta, the common bistort
- Ulmus × hollandica 'Superba', an elm variety
- La Superba, a red giant star

== See also ==
- Superbus (disambiguation)
- Brooklyn Superbas, baseball team
