= French ship Superbe =

At least twelve ships of the French Navy have borne the name Superbe ("Superb"):

== Ships named Superbe ==
- French ship Superbe (1671), a second-rank ship of the line, lead ship of her class.
- French galley Superbe (1675), a galley.
- French galley Superbe (1682), a galley .
- French ship Superbe (1690), an Invincible-class 70-gun ship of the line.
- French galley Superbe (1696), a Fleur de Lis-class galley.
- French ship Superbe (1708), a 60-gun ship of the line.
- French ship Superbe (1738), a 74-gun ship of the line.
- French ship Superbe (1775), a 74-gun (?) ship of the line, formerly a 64-gun East Indiaman, launched on 11 March 1774, built from 1772 on plans by Groignard.
- French ship Superbe (1784), a Téméraire-class 74-gun ship of the line.
- French corvette Superbe (1795), a 24-gun corvette.
- French ship Superbe (1804), a 74-gun ship of the line, better known as Breslaw.
- French ship Superbe (1814), a Téméraire-class 74-gun ship of the line.
Ships of the French Navy named Superbe
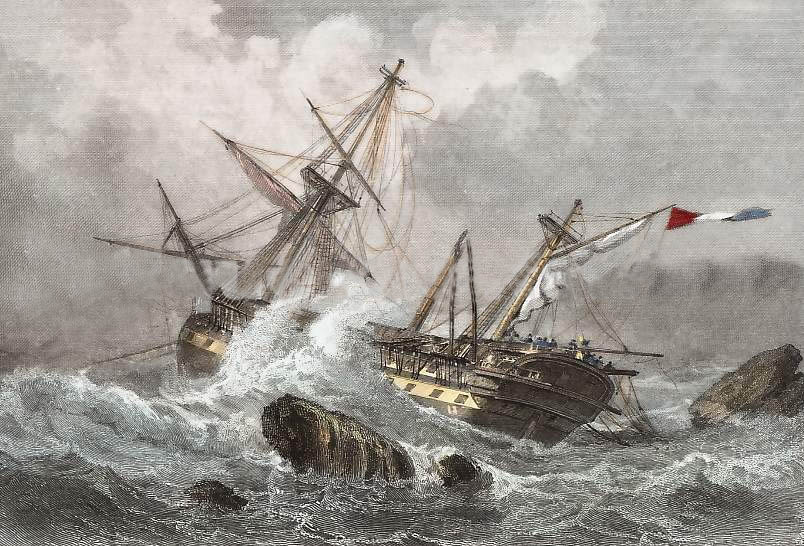
Superbe wrecked at Paros, by J. Outhwaite

== See also ==
- HMS Superb

== Notes and references ==
=== Bibliography ===
- Roche, Jean-Michel (2005). Dictionnaire des bâtiments de la flotte de guerre française de Colbert à nos jours. Vol. 1. Group Retozel-Maury Millau. pp. 425–426. ISBN 978-2-9525917-0-6. OCLC 165892922.
- Roche, Jean-Michel (2005). Dictionnaire des bâtiments de la flotte de guerre française de Colbert à nos jours. Vol. 2. Group Retozel-Maury Millau. ISBN 978-2-9525917-0-6. OCLC 165892922.
- Demerliac, Alain (2004). La Marine de Louis XVI: Nomenclature des Navires Français de 1774 à 1792 (in French). Éditions Ancre. ISBN 2-906381-23-3.
