= Superb =

Superb may refer to:

- Škoda Superb car
- HMS Superb, nine Royal Navy ships
- The Superb, a railroad car used by US President Warren G. Harding
- SuperB, a proposed particle physics facility in Italy
- Grevillea 'Superb', a widely grown grevillea (shrub) cultivar
- Superb, subsidiary of Hybe Corporation
- The Superbs, a 1960s female R&B group that evolved into the group Devotion

== See also ==
- Superbe (disambiguation)
