= French ship Duquesne (1813) =

Ship of the line of the French Navy

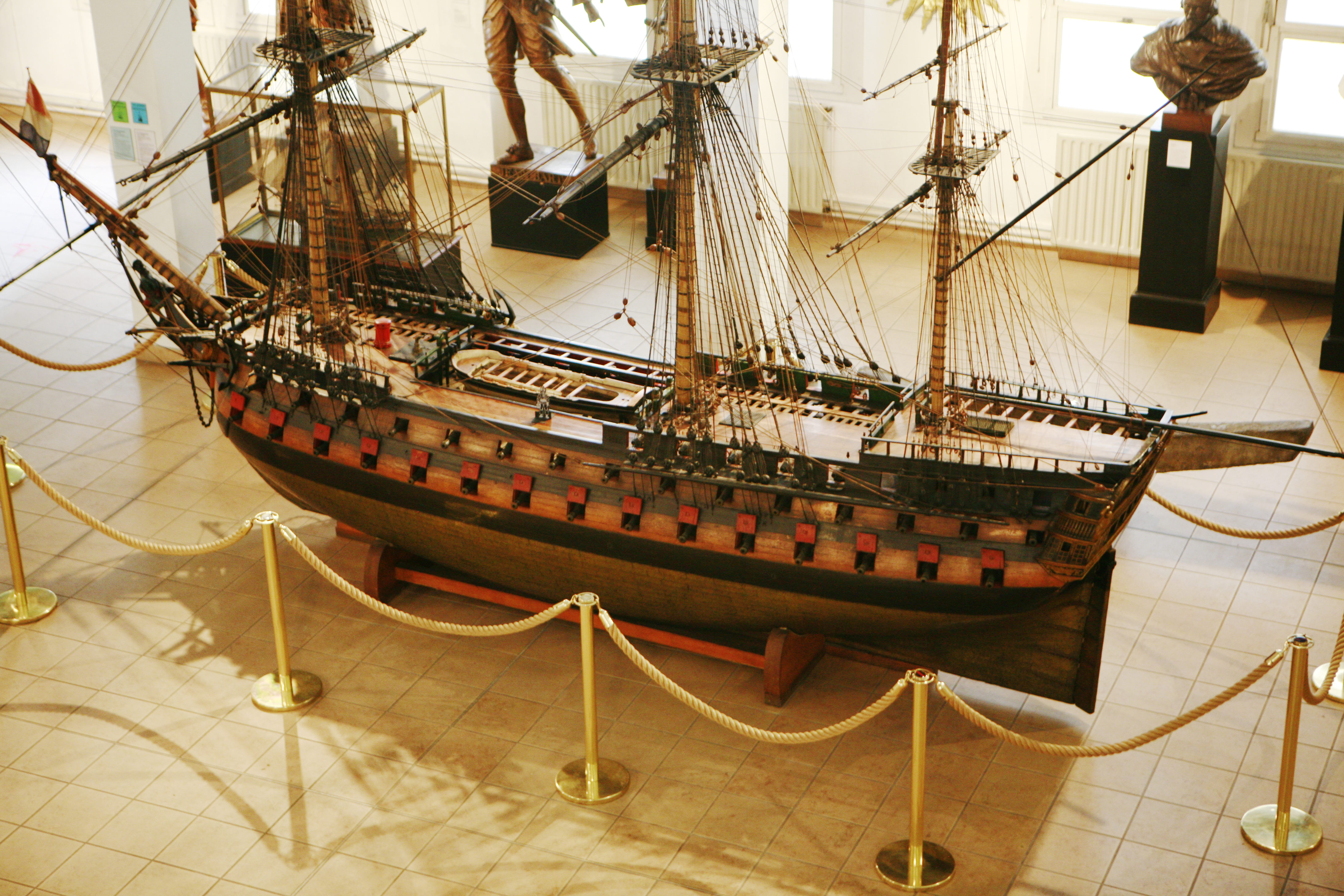
- Scale model of Duquesne, on display at the Musée de la Marine in Toulon

History

France
- Name: Duquesne, Zélandais
- Namesake: Abraham Duquesne, Zealand
- Builder: Cherbourg
- Laid down: 1 October 1810
- Launched: 12 October 1813
- Commissioned: 30 June 1814
- Stricken: 19 November 1836
- Fate: Hulked 1832

General characteristics
- Class & type: Bucentaure-class ship of the line
- Displacement: 3,868 tonneaux
- Tons burthen: 2,034 port tonneaux
- Length: 59.28 m (194 ft 6 in)
- Beam: 15.27 m (50 ft 1 in)
- Draught: 7.8 m (25 ft 7 in)
- Depth of hold: 7.64 m (25 ft 1 in)
- Sail plan: Full-rigged ship
- Crew: 866 (wartime)
- Armament: 90 guns: Lower gun deck: 30 × 36 pdr guns; Upper gun deck: 32 × 24 pdr guns; Forecastle and Quarterdeck: 14 × 12 pdr guns & 14 × 36 pdr carronades

Duquesne (French pronunciation: [dykɛːn]) was a 3rd rank, 90-gun Bucentaure-class ship of the line built for the French Navy during the 1810s. Completed in 1813, she played a minor role in the French invasion of Algiers in 1830.

== Description ==
Designed by Jacques-Noël Sané, the Bucentaure-class ships had a length of 59.28 metres (194 ft 6 in), a beam of 15.27 metres (50 ft 1 in) and a depth of hold of 7.64 metres (25 ft 1 in). The ships displaced 3,868 tonneaux and had a mean draught of 7.8 metres (25 ft 7 in). They had a tonnage of 2,034 port tonneaux. Their crew numbered 866 officers and ratings during wartime. They were fitted with three masts and ship rigged.

The muzzle-loading, smoothbore armament of the Bucentaure class consisted of thirty 36-pounder long guns on the lower gun deck and thirty-two 24-pounder long guns on the upper gun deck. The armament on the quarterdeck and forecastle varied as the ships' authorised armament was changed over the years that the Bucentares were built. Duquesne was fitted with fourteen 12-pounder long guns and fourteen 36-pounder carronades.

== Construction and career ==
Duquesne was laid down on 1 October 1810 at the Arsenal de Cherbourg as Zélandais and launched on 27 April 1812. The ship was commissioned on 16 October 1813 and completed in March 1814. She was renamed Duquesne following the Bourbon Restoration on 29 April 1814. During the Hundred Days, she was renamed Zélandais on 22 March 1815, and then reverted to Duquesne again on 15 July when Louis XVIII returned on the throne.

The ship was refitted in 1822 at Brest and participated in the Invasion of Algiers in 1830 under Captain Bazoche. After the July Revolution, she was again renamed Zélandais. On 24 January 1834, she ferried survivors of the wreck of Superbe to Toulon. She was again used as a troopship and was struck on 19 November 1836.

== Bibliography ==
- Roche, Jean-Michel (2005). Dictionnaire des bâtiments de la flotte de guerre française de Colbert à nos jours [Dictionary of French Warships from Colbert to Today]. Vol. 1: 1671-1870. Roche. ISBN 978-2-9525917-0-6. OCLC 165892922.
- Winfield, Rif and Roberts, Stephen S. (2015) French Warships in the Age of Sail 1786-1861: Design, Construction, Careers and Fates. Seaforth Publishing. ISBN 978-1-84832-204-2
