= Parc botanique du Château d'Ouge =

Private park with botanical garden and arboretum in Franche-Comté, France

Coordinates: 47.7967°N 5.7060°E

The Parc botanique du Château d'Ouge (8 hectares) is a private park with botanical garden and arboretum located at 1-3 rue du Colombier, Ouge, Haute-Saône, Franche-Comté, France. It is open Saturdays in June upon prior request; an admission fee is charged.

Construction of the Château d'Ouge began in the early 16th century by the Faulquier family, and was completed in 1590 by Guillaume Lullier. Its park opens onto countryside, pastures, and forest typical of the region.

Today's botanical park was started in 1980 by Bernard and Jean-Louis Bajolet, who have subsequently planted over 250 trees (representing 78 species) and over 1600 bushes and shrubs (90 species), while preserving the park's existing mature specimens of ash, walnut, cherry, etc. A renaissance garden was introduced in 1997. The park also contains an orchard and vegetable garden.

== See also ==
- List of botanical gardens in France
