= Saône =

River in eastern France

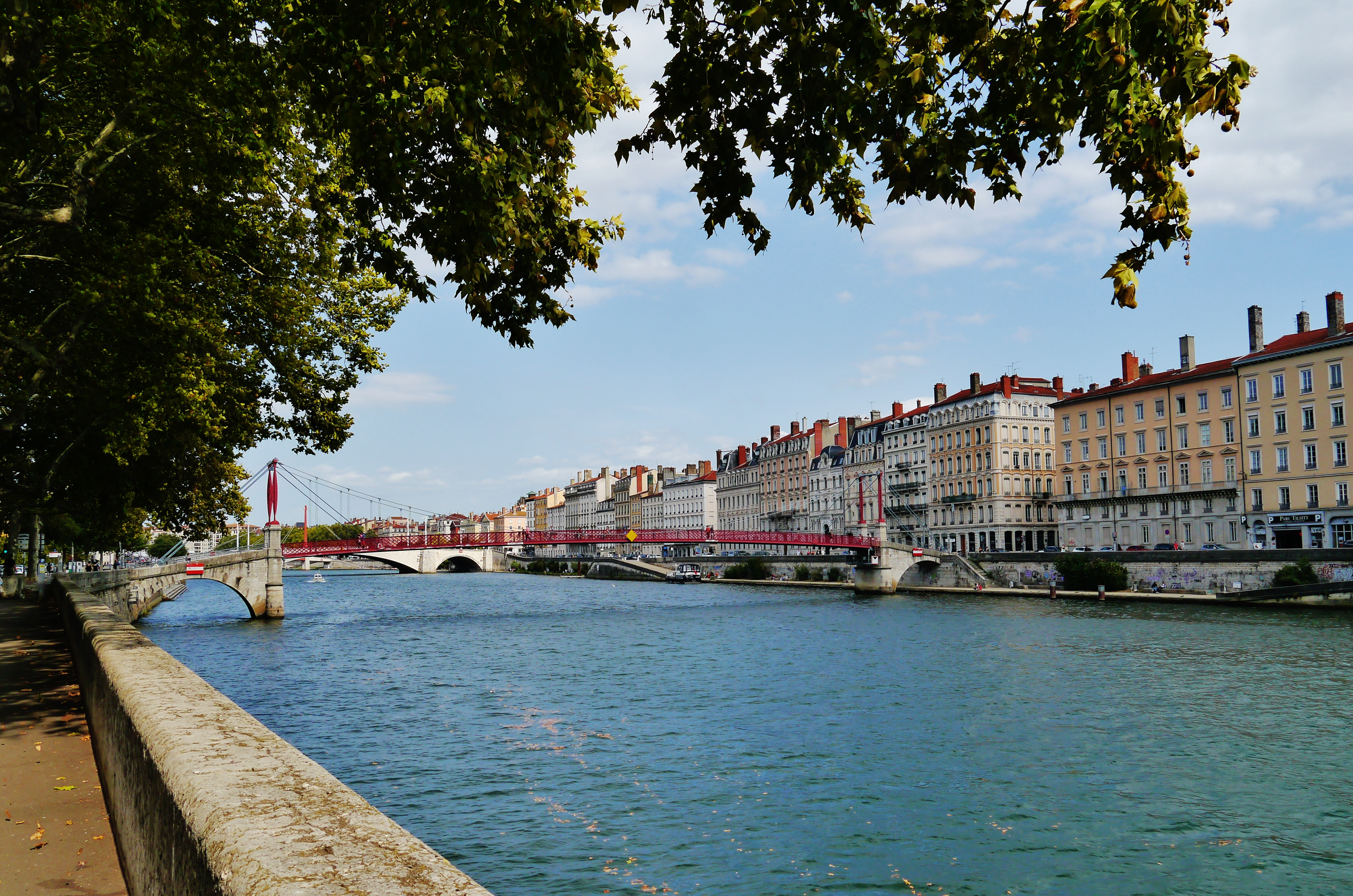
- The Saône in Lyon

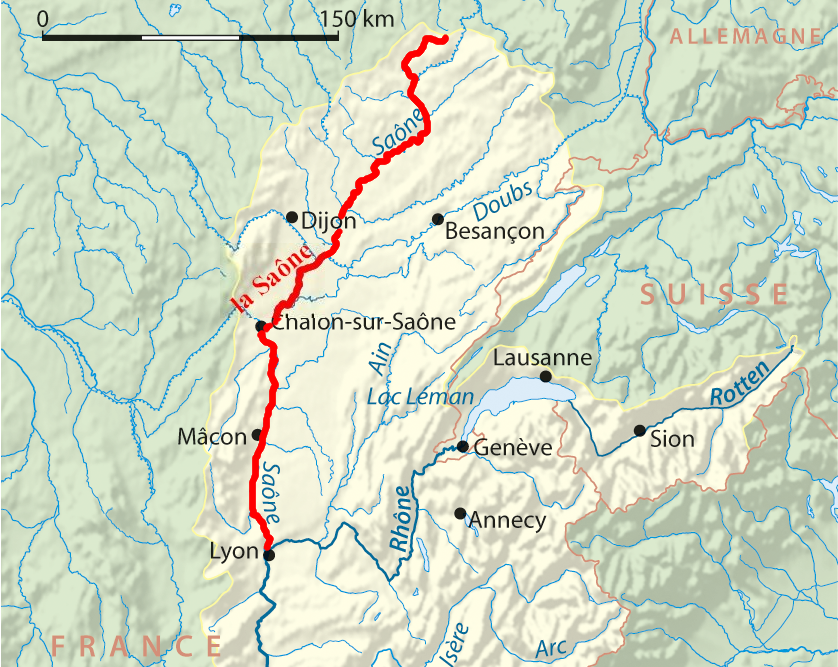
- Course of the Saône
- Native name: Sona (Arpitan)

Location
- Country: France

Physical characteristics
- Source: Vioménil
  - location: Vosges
  - coordinates: 48.094444°N 6.181944°E
  - elevation: 392 m (1,286 ft)
- Mouth: Rhône
  - location: Lyon, France
  - coordinates: 45°43′39″N 4°49′4″E
  - elevation: 158 m (518 ft)
- Length: 473 km (294 mi)
- Discharge
  - average: 410 m^{3}/s (14,000 cu ft/s)

Basin features
- Progression: Rhône→ Mediterranean Sea
- Tributaries
  - left: Doubs, Lanterne
  - right: Azergues, Morgon

The Saône (/soʊn/ SOHN, French: [son]; Arpitan: Sona; Latin: Arar) is a river in eastern France (modern region of Bourgogne-Franche-Comté). It is a right tributary of the Rhône, rising at Vioménil in the Vosges department and joining the Rhône in Lyon, at the southern end of the Presqu'île.

== Terminology ==
The name Saône derives from that of the Gallic river goddess Souconna, which has also been connected with a local Celtic tribe, the Sequanes. Monastic copyists progressively transformed Souconna to Saoconna, which ultimately gave rise to Saône. The other recorded ancient names for the river were Brigoulus and Arar. The name Arar later gave rise to specific regional terms in historiography, created to designate various northern parts of historical Burgundy in relation to the river Saône. Depending on the point of view of a particular author, northern Burgundian lands were thus designated whether "on this side of Saône" (Burgundia Cisararica) or "on the other side of Saône" (Burgundia Transararica).

== Geography ==
The Saône rises at Vioménil at the foot of the cliff of the Faucilles in the Vosges at an elevation of 392 metres (1,286 ft); it flows into the Rhône at Lyon at an elevation of 158 metres (518 ft).

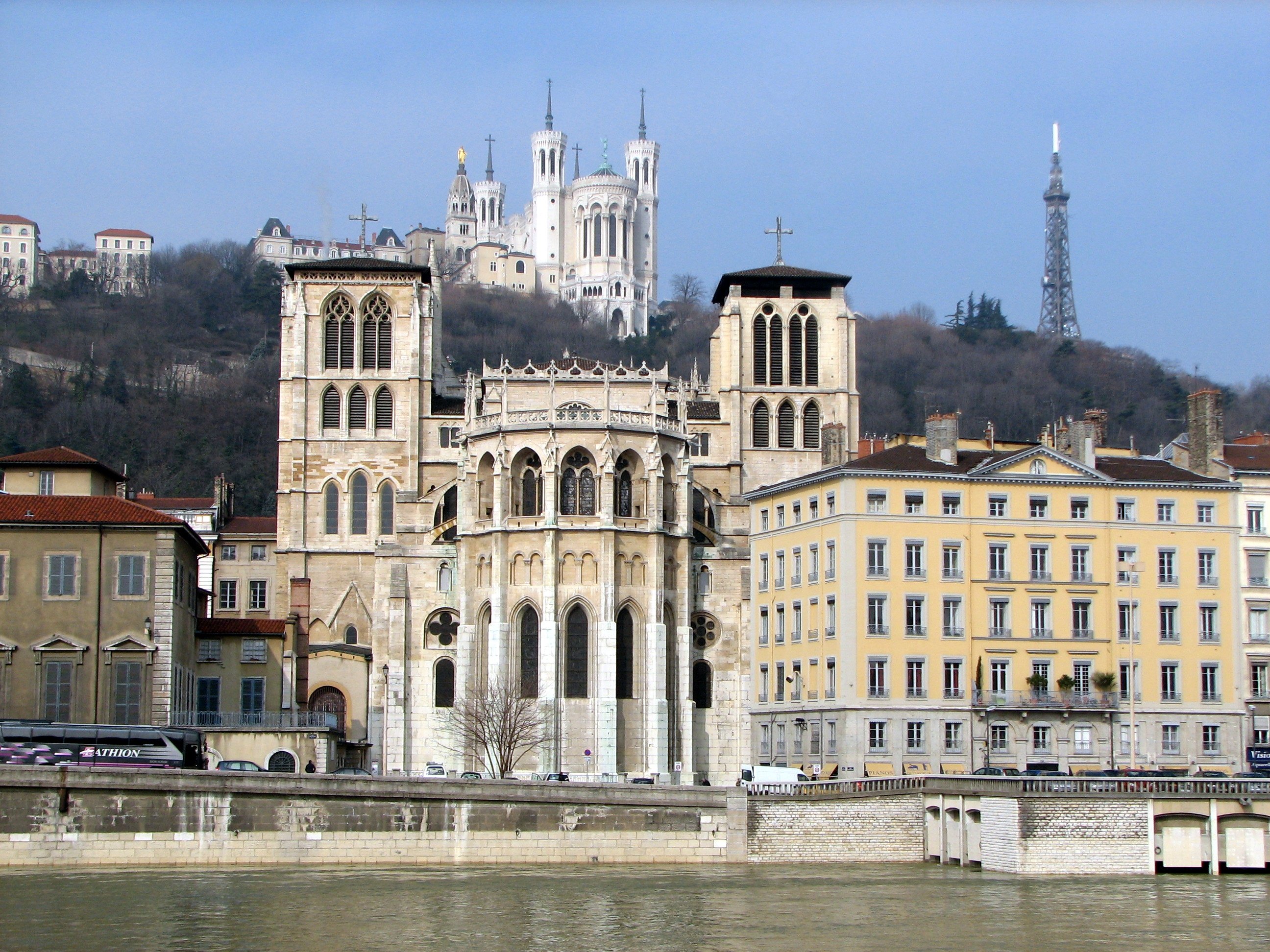
Scenic view of the banks of the Saône in Lyon, showing Lyon Cathedral, the Basilica of Notre-Dame de Fourvière and the Tour métallique de Fourvière (both in the background)

Its length is 473 kilometres (294 mi). Its largest tributary is the Doubs; upstream of receiving the Doubs at Verdun-sur-le-Doubs in Saône-et-Loire, the Saône is called the "Petite Saône" (lesser Saône), which reflects the large contribution of the Doubs to the Saône. In fact the Doubs's mean annual flow rate is slightly stronger than that of the Petite Saône, 175 cubic metres per second (6,200 cu ft/s) compared to 160 cubic metres per second (5,700 cu ft/s); some thus assert that it is in fact the Saône that flows into the Doubs. Nonetheless, the Saône has a substantially larger watershed than the Doubs, at 11,500 square kilometres (4,400 mi^{2}) vs. 7,500 square kilometres (2,900 mi^{2}).

At 30,000 square kilometres (12,000 mi^{2}) the Saône has the largest watershed of any French river that does not flow directly into the sea, covering approximately 1/18 of metropolitan France.

In pre-Roman times the river's name was "Arar", a doubling of the Indo-European root ar (water). According to Julius Caesar's Commentaries on the Gallic War this doubling reflected the idea that it was difficult to identify the direction of the river due to its slow rate of flow. The Battle of the Arar was the first major battle of the Gallic Wars. Its current name came from a sacred spring, Sauc-Onna, located at Chalon, which was used by Roman legionaries to refer to the entire river.

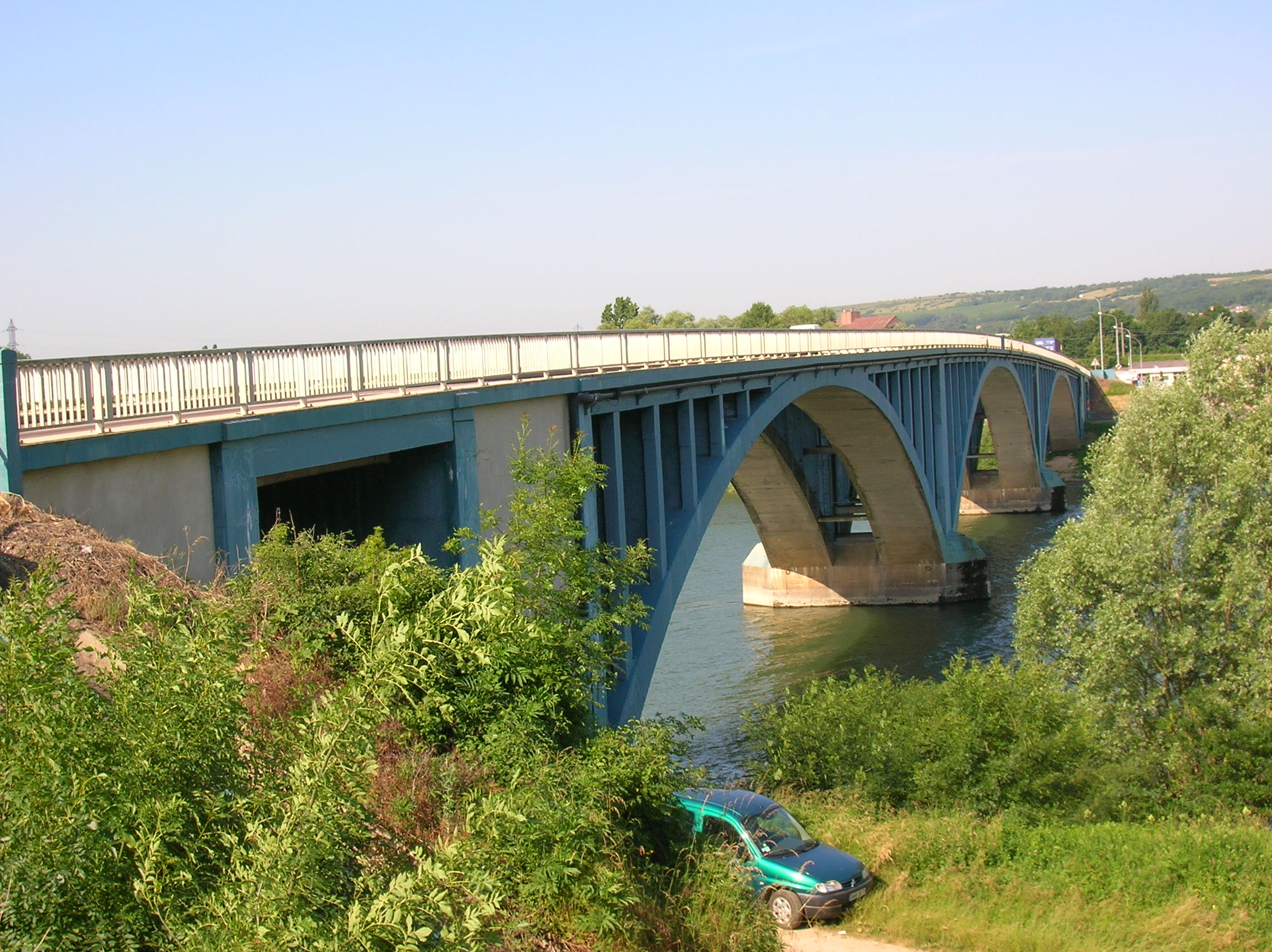
Bridge over the Saône at Tournus

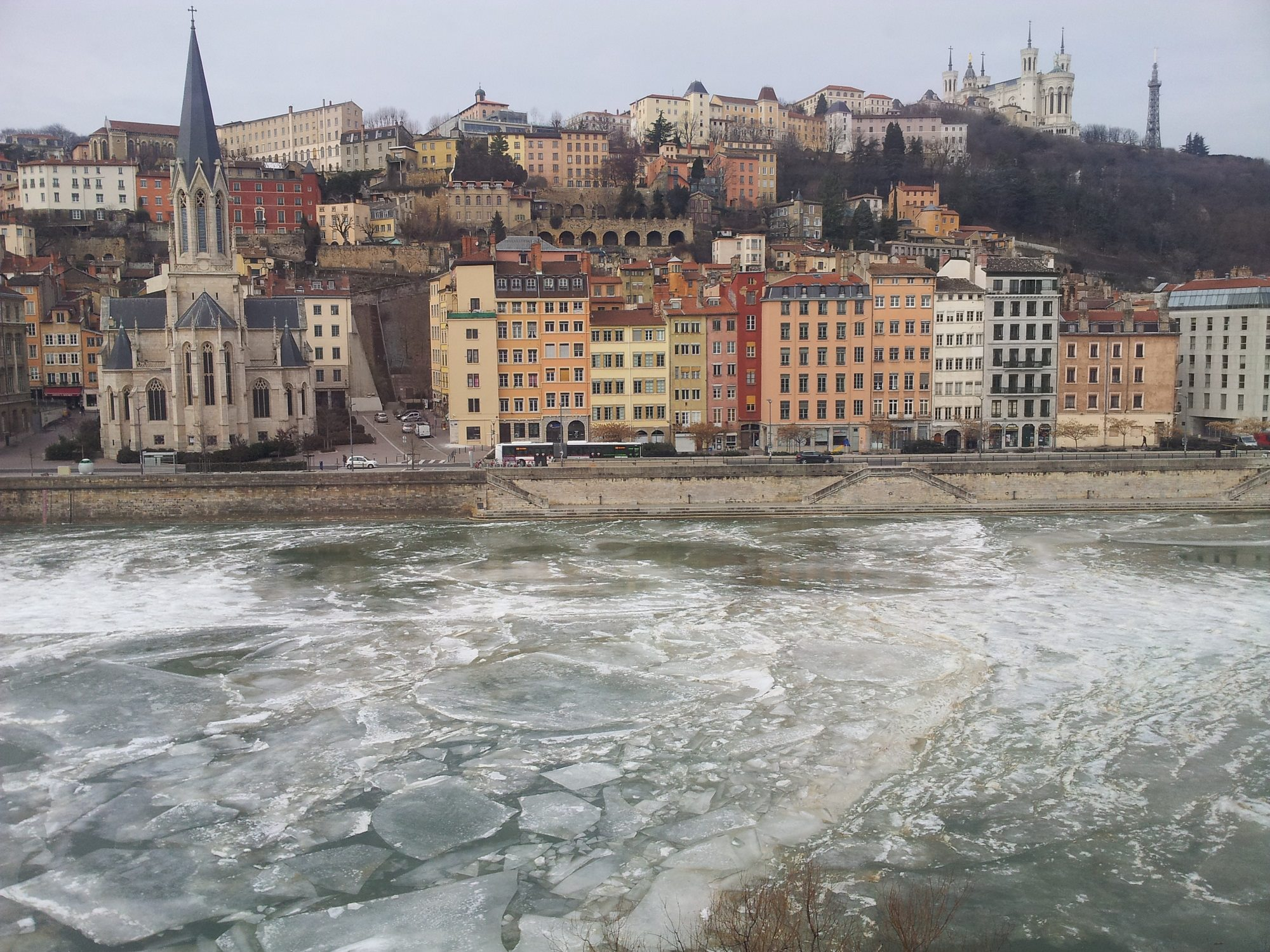
View over the Saône, Lyon city centre

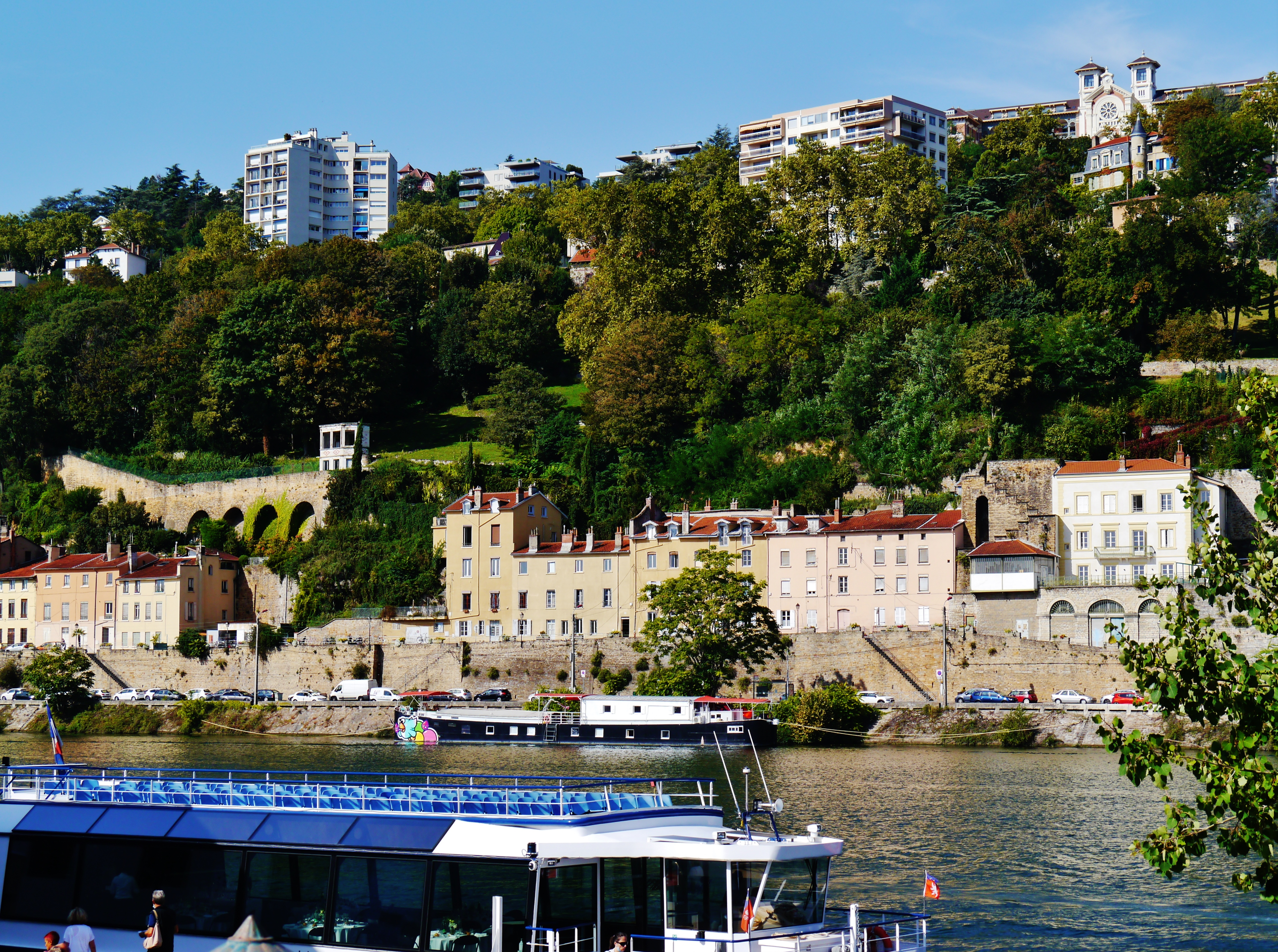
La Mulatière seen from the Presqu'île

=== Departments and cities traversed by the Saône ===
River Saône between two Burgundian historical lands: the Duchy of Burgundy and the Free County of Burgundy

- Vosges: Darney, Monthureux-sur-Saône, Châtillon-sur-Saône
- Haute-Saône: Jonvelle, Corre, Jussey, Port-sur-Saône, Scey-sur-Saône, Gray
- Côte-d'Or: Auxonne, Saint-Jean-de-Losne, Seurre
- Saône-et-Loire: Verdun-sur-le-Doubs, Chalon-sur-Saône, Tournus, Mâcon, Crêches-sur-Saône
- Ain: Thoissey, Montmerle-sur-Saône, Jassans-Riottier
- Rhône: Belleville-sur-Saône, Villefranche-sur-Saône, Anse, Neuville-sur-Saône, Fontaines-sur-Saône, Caluire-et-Cuire, Lyon

=== Main tributaries of the Saône ===
R indicates a right tributary, L indicates a left tributary.

- Ourche (L)
- Gras (R)
- Apance (R)
- Côney (L)
- Amance (R)
- Ougeotte (R)
- Superbe (L)
- Lanterne (L)
- Scyotte (L)
- Durgeon (L)
- Romaine (L)
- Gourgeonne (R)
- Vannon (R)
- Salon (R)
- Morthe or Morte (L)
- Ecoulottes (R)
- Ténise (L)
- Vingeanne (R)
- Ognon (L)
- Bèze (R)
- Tille (R)
- Ouche (R)
- Vouge (R)
- Doubs (L)
- Dheune (R)
- Thalie (R)
- Cosne (L)
- Grosne (R)
- Tenarre (L)
- Seille (L)
- Reyssouze (L)
- Mouge (R)
- Veyle (L)
- l'Arlois (R)
- Mauvaise (R)
- Chalaronne (L)
- Ardière (R)
- Vauxonne (R)
- Morgon (R)
- Formans (L)
- Azergues (R)

== Navigation ==
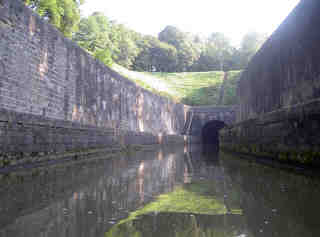
Saint Albin tunnel at Scey-sur-Saône-et-Saint-Albin

The Saône is navigable from its confluence with the Coney at Corre in the north of the département Haute-Saône all the way to its confluence with the Rhône (itself a navigable river) at La Mulatière, in Lyon. The navigable stretch is 367 kilometres (228 mi) long, of which 206 kilometres (128 mi) has been redeveloped to European high-capacity dimensions from Saint-Symphorien-sur-Saône to Lyon. It has 5 locks. The 161 km long part upstream from Saint-Symphorien-sur-Saône to Corre, also named Petite Saône, is navigable for Freycinet gauge ships and has 19 locks.

The Saône is linked with the Loire by the Canal du Centre, with the Yonne by the Canal de Bourgogne, with the Marne by the Canal entre Champagne et Bourgogne (previously the Canal de la Marne à la Saône), with the Meuse by the Canal de l'Est, whose southern branch has been renamed the Canal des Vosges, and with the Rhine by the Canal du Rhône au Rhin. All the canals are Freycinet gauge.

Also navigable are the small Canal de Pont-de-Vaux (3 km), the Seille, navigable in a 40-kilometre (25 mi) stretch up to Louhans, as well as the lower part of the Doubs. None of these three connect the Saône to any other waterway.

== Hydrology ==
=== The lesser Saône (Petite Saône) ===
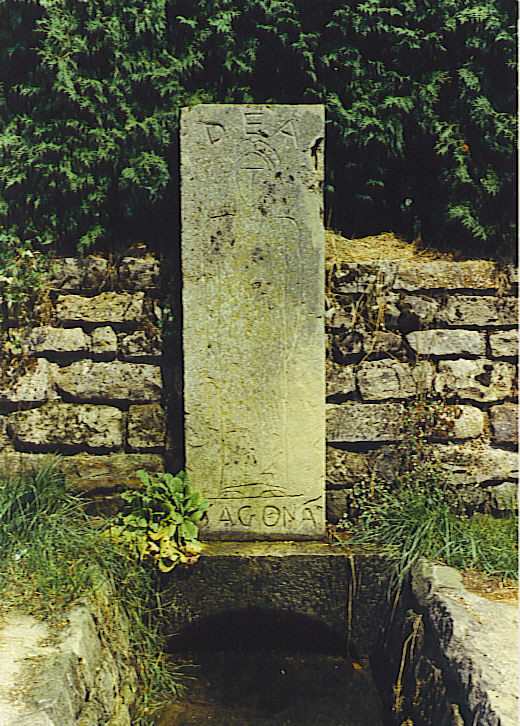
Source of the Saône at Vioménil

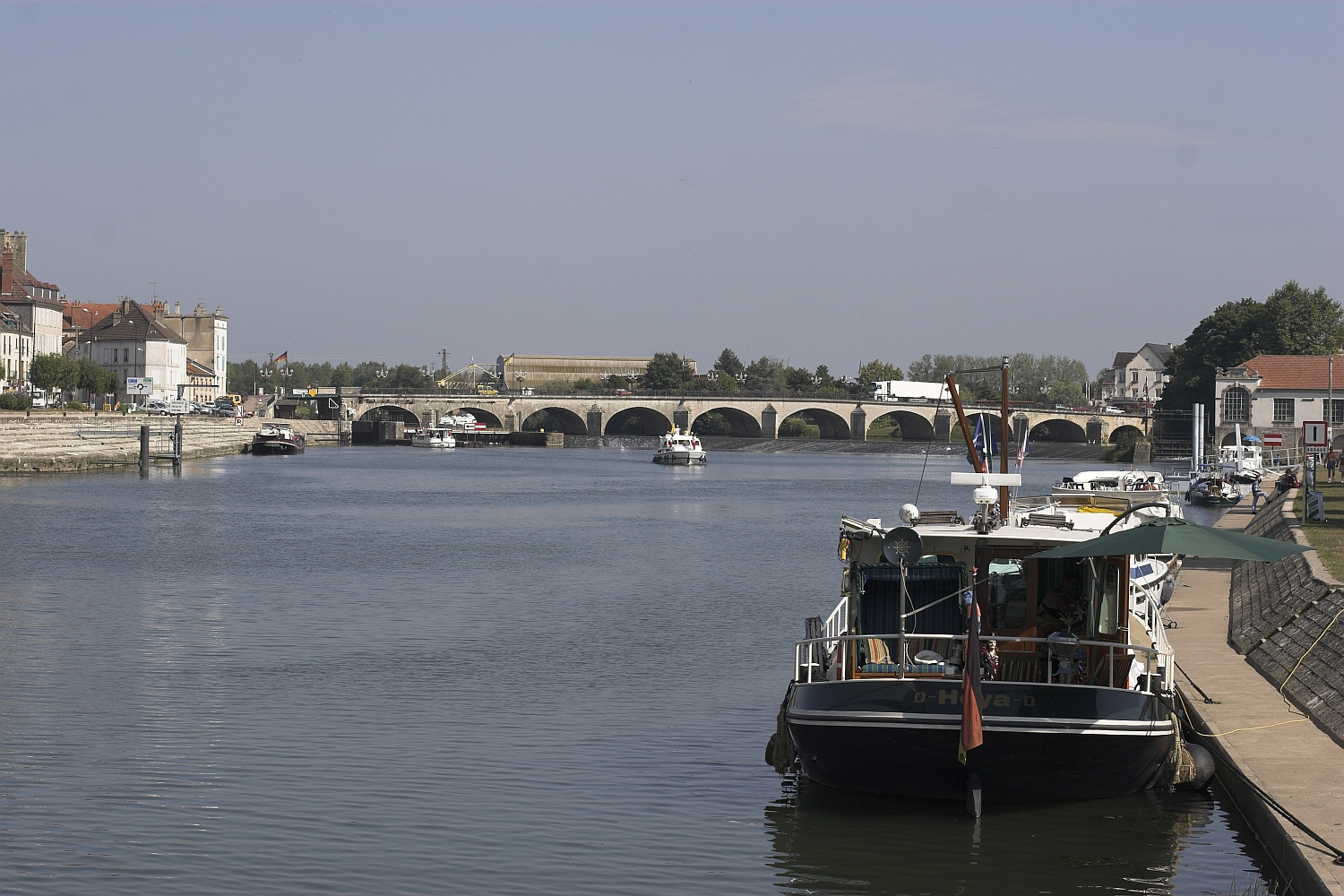
The Saône at Gray

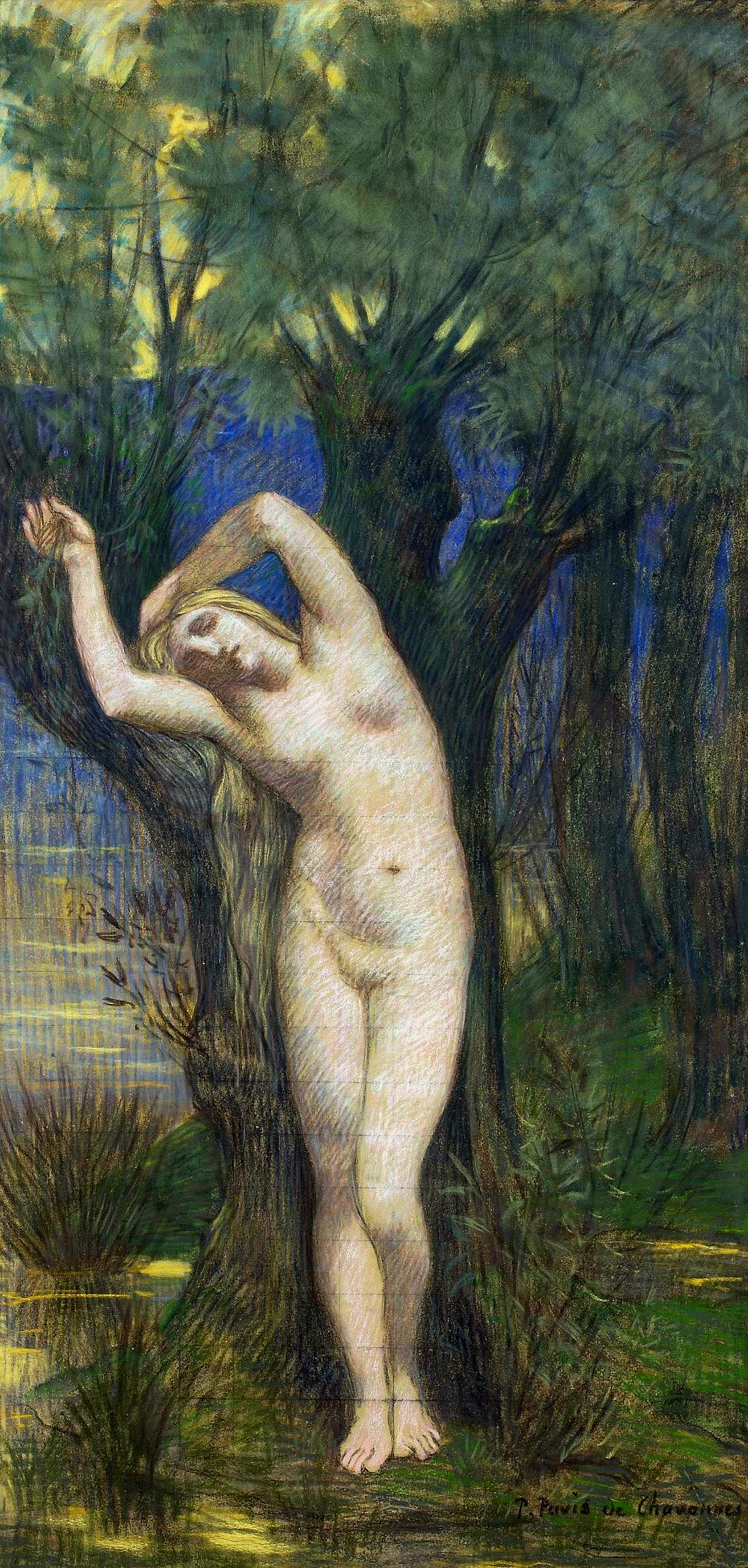
Personification of the Saône by Pierre Puvis de Chavannes, 1883–1886, National Museum in Warsaw, a study for decoration of the stairwell in the new wing of the Palace of Fine Arts in Lyon, a city at the confluence of the Saône and Rhône rivers

The lesser Saône has a tendency to flood (sometimes influenced by snow), with a very strong oceanic effect. The soils are not susceptible to much infiltration, so that they saturate quickly which contributes to surface runoff. The flow rate grows very quickly, and after receiving the waters of the Lanterne, the Saône already becomes a powerful river.

The mean annual flow rate, or discharge, of the Saône has been measured over 50 years (as of 2013) at the Ray-sur-Saône hydrological station, situated about 30 kilometres (19 mi) after the Lanterne confluence between Port-sur-Saône and Gray. The figure is 59.7 cubic metres per second (2,110 cu ft/s) for a watershed area of 3,740 square kilometres (1,440 mi^{2}) (the upper basin of the lesser Saône), and has an annual maximum of 64.5 cubic metres per second (2,280 cu ft/s) and a minimum of 54.8 cubic metres per second (1,940 cu ft/s).

The river exhibits seasonal variations in flow rate, with winter floods from 84 to 108 cubic metres per second (3,000 to 3,800 cu ft/s) from December to March inclusive, and summer reductions in July/August/September falling to a monthly average of 16.9 cubic metres per second (600 cu ft/s) in August.

The runoff curve number in the upper basin of the lesser Saône is 505 millimetres (19.9 in) annually, cf. 687 millimetres (27.0 in) for the Lanterne, an elevated figure resulting from the very high rainfall in the Vosgian part of its watershed. The specific flow rate rises to 16.0 litres per second per square kilometre of watershed.

The maximum instantaneous recorded flow rate was 930 cubic metres per second (33,000 cu ft/s) on December 19, 1982.

=== The greater Saône (Grande Saône) ===
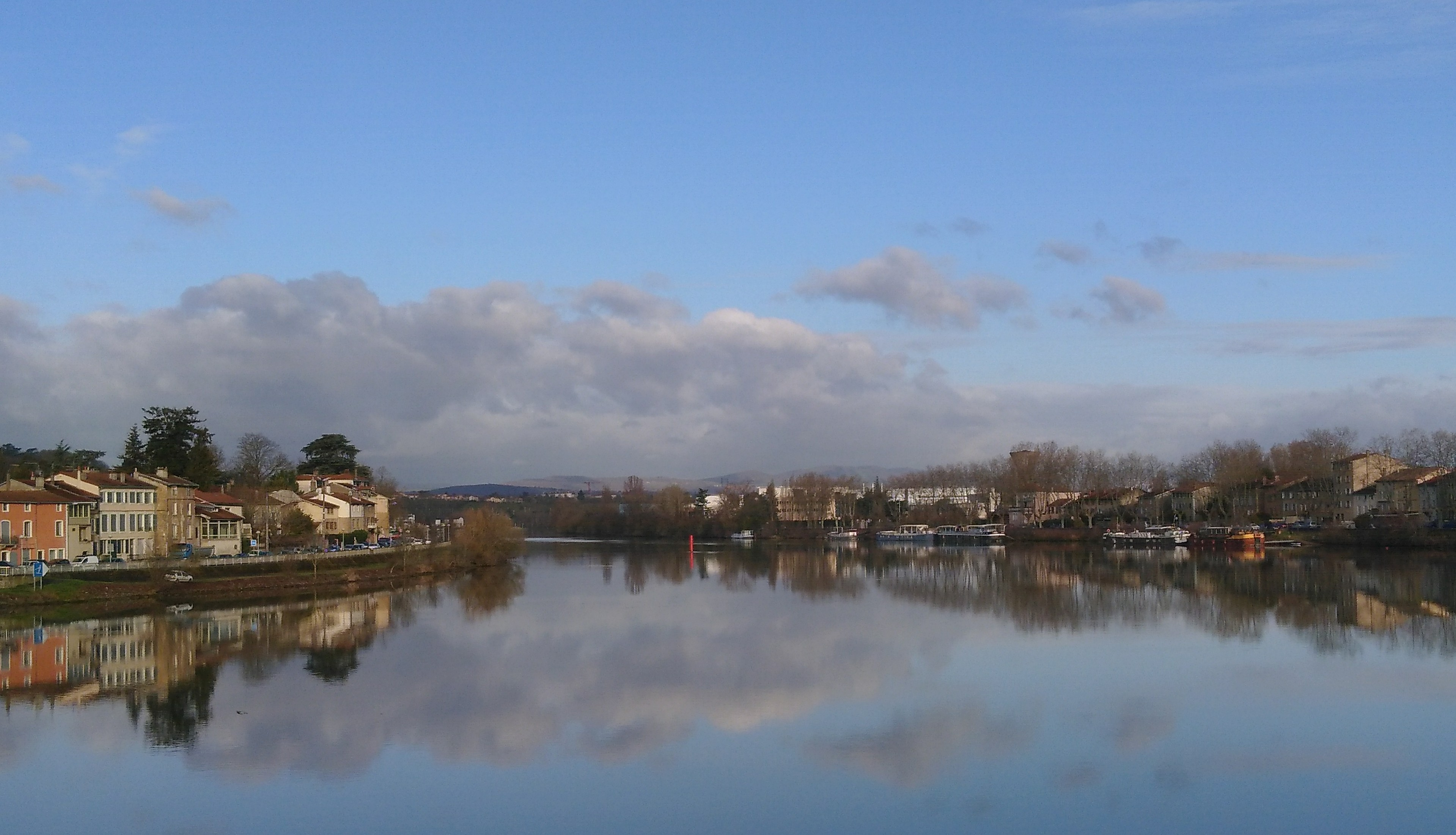
The Saône at Neuville-sur-Saône

The greater Saône is formed by the confluence of the Doubs and the lesser Saône at Verdun-sur-le-Doubs. The Doubs brings a mean annual flow rate of 175 cubic metres per second (6,200 cu ft/s), and the lesser Saône, 160 cubic metres per second (5,700 cu ft/s).

The greater Saône has only modest tributaries which have little effect on floods or other hydrological properties. It flows in a vast plain approximately 3 kilometres (2 mi) wide as far as Lyon in the basin of the former Bressan lake. The slope is very gradual, and without hydraulic projects up to the north of Chalon aimed at guaranteeing a deep navigation channel, overflows would be more frequent.

At the Couzon-au-Mont-d'Or hydrological station, where the river enters the Lyon area, measurements taken between 1969 and 1986 revealed a mean annual flow rate of 473 cubic metres per second (16,700 cu ft/s), with a 100-year flood flow rate of 3,180 cubic metres per second (112,000 cu ft/s) The runoff curve number from the river's entire watershed is 501 millimetres (19.7 in), and the specific flow rate rises to 15.8 litres per second per square km of watershed.

==== Average flow rate ====
Mean monthly discharge (in m^{3}/s)
Hydrological station : Couzon-au-Mont-d'Or (date unknown)
Source : Banque Hydro – Station U4710010

Overall, the average flow rate in Lyon is 475 cubic metres per second (16,800 cu ft/s), with a minimum of 153 cubic metres per second (5,400 cu ft/s), in August, and a maximum of 954 cubic metres per second (33,700 cu ft/s), in February.

=== Historic floods ===
When the Saône floods, the impact varies considerably over the course of the river. A large flood with a strong flow rate upstream can be largely attenuated in the Bressan plain so as to have only moderate impact at Mâcon, particularly if it carries a limited volume of water. By contrast, a medium-sized flood of the lesser Saône can turn into a significant flood downstream, if the Doubs brings in a similar contribution at about the same time.

Historic floods include:

- The Lyon flood of 580
- The floods of 1602 during the autumn equinox and of 1711
- The flood of November 1840, with an estimated flow rate of almost 4,000 cubic metres per second (140,000 cu ft/s), destroyed numerous habitations along the river valley. Many plaques marking this serious event are still visible in the villages affected. The high water measured at flood scales reached 8.05 metres (26.4 ft) at Mâcon and 7.28 metres (23.9 ft) at Chalon, or about 6 and 5.5 metres (20 and 18 ft) respectively above normal levels).
- The flood of May 1856
- The largest floods in the last 50 years as of 2006: January 1955, March 1970, December 1981 and 1982, May 1983, March 2001 and 2006.

The reference flood in town planning is the 100-year flood. This reference was in the course of being modified as maps linked to modelling the 1840 flood in modern town planning conditions were distributed to local mayors in December 2008, and as new prevention plans were ordered for 2012.

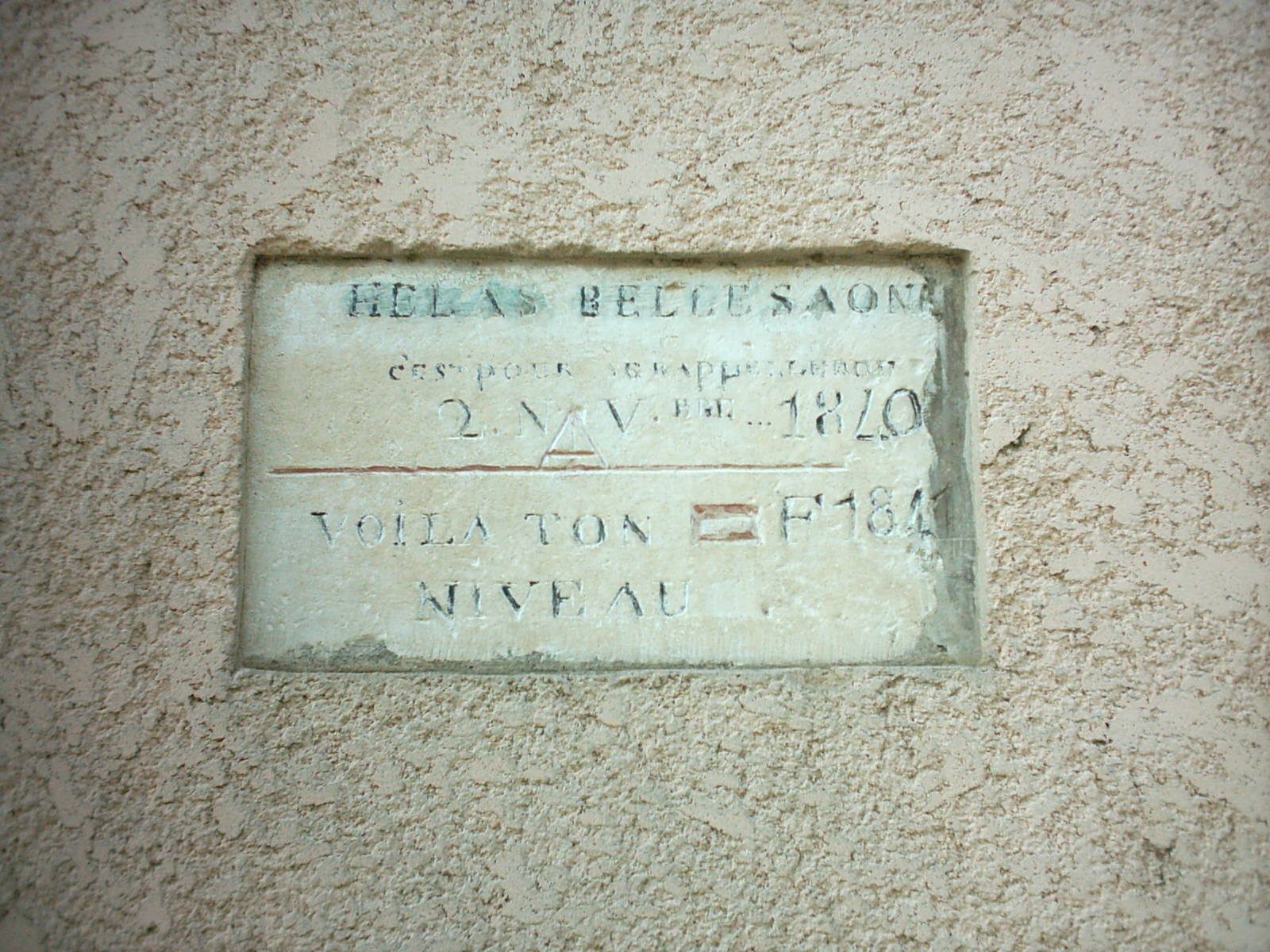
A plaque commemorating the flood of 1840 at Quincieux

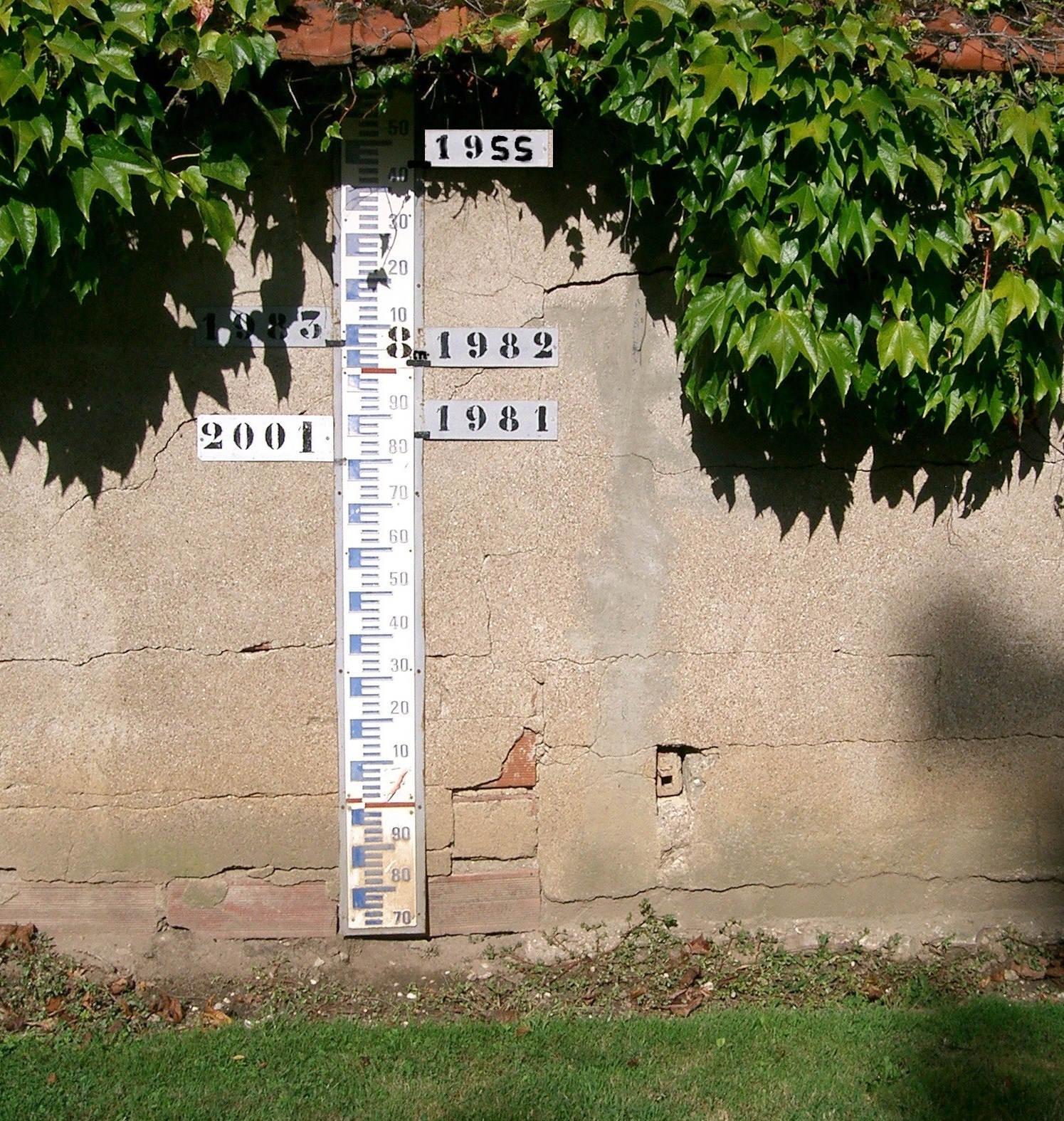
Historic floods since 1950 Écuelles, north Saône-et-Loire

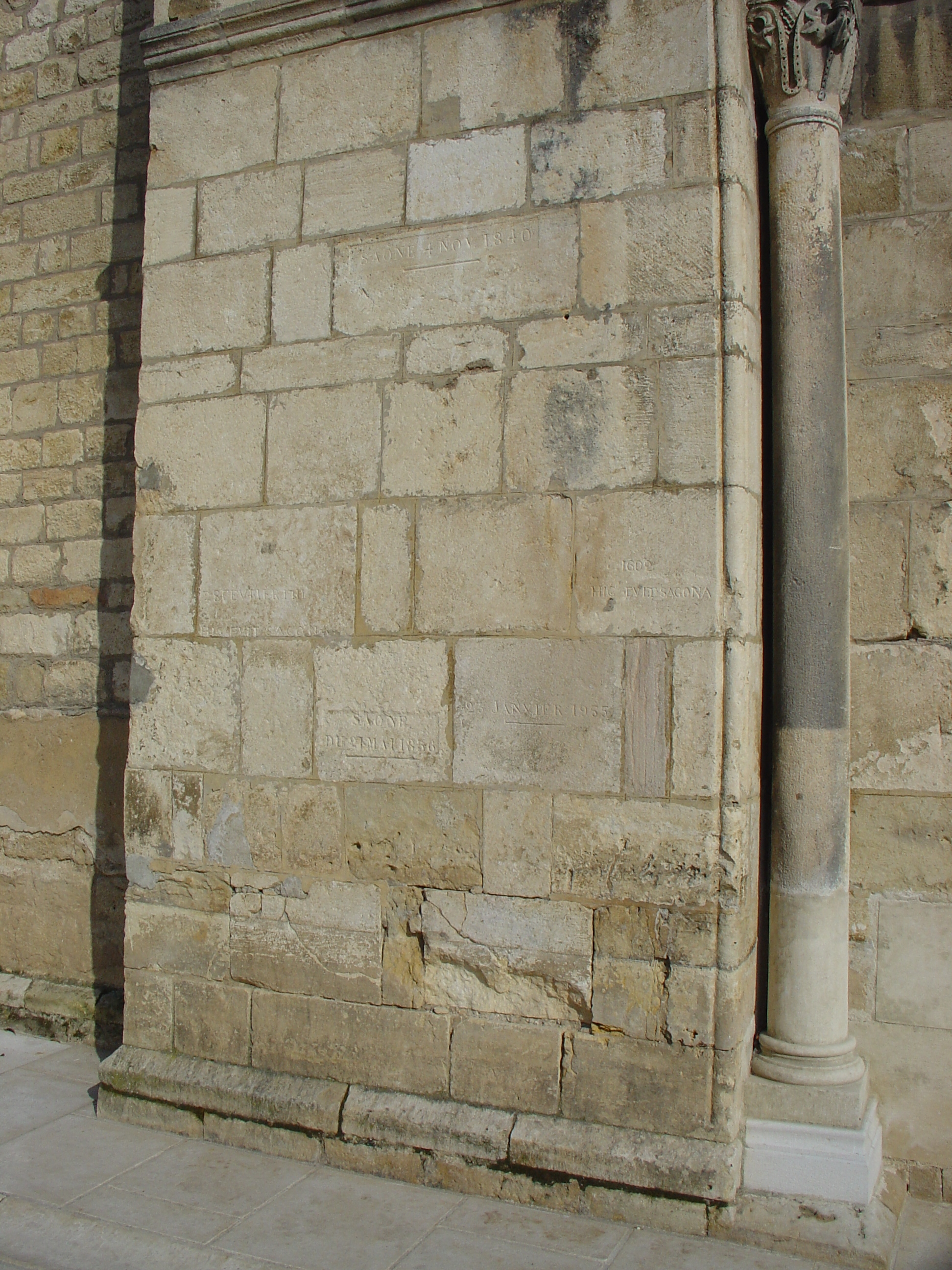
Indicators of the level of historic floods of the Saône on the Church of Notre-Dame de Belleville

== See also ==
- List of rivers in France
- The Rhône
- The Doubs
- Saône is also a commune in the Doubs department
- Chizerots
