= Superbe (river) =

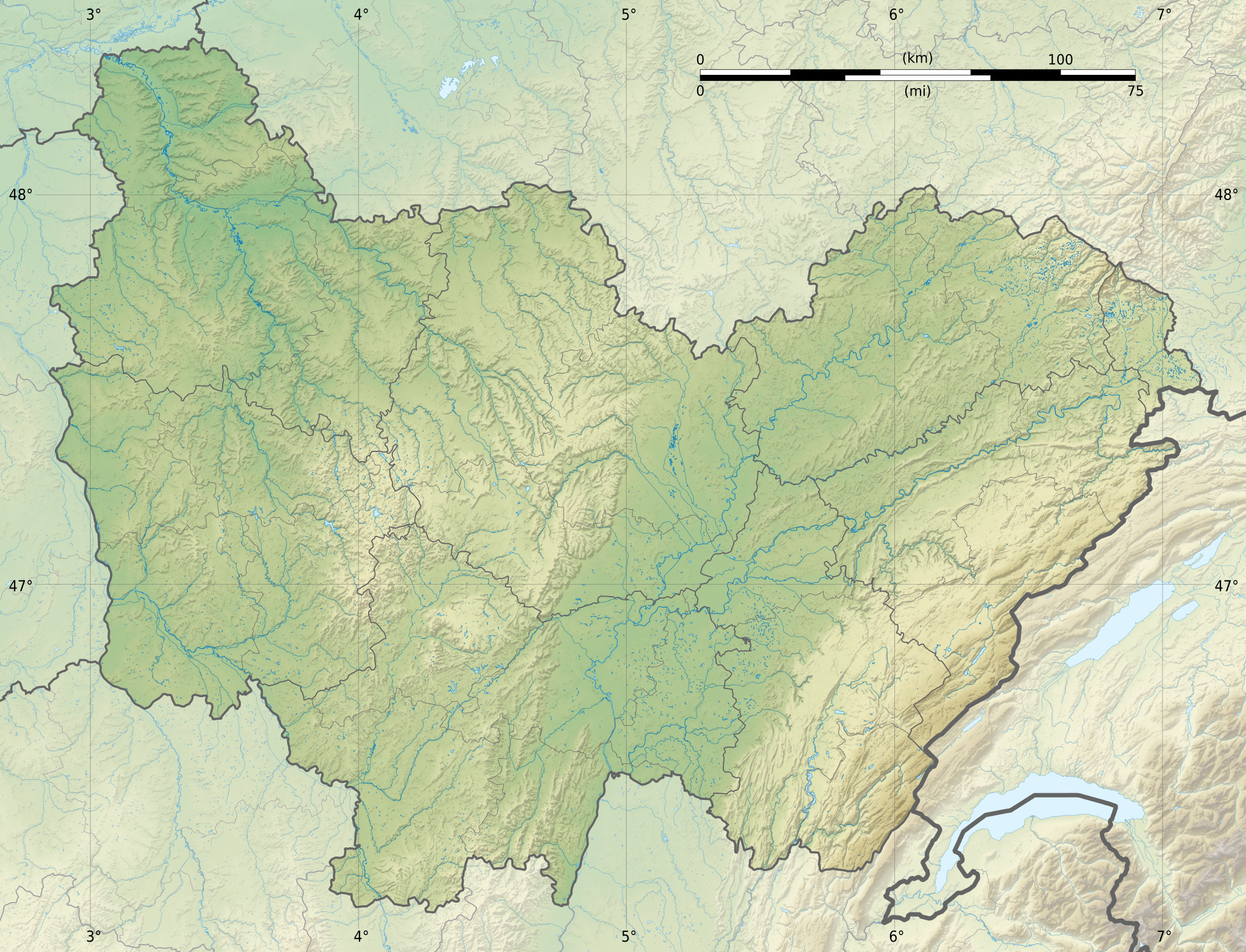
- Location within France Location within Bourgogne-Franche-Comté

Location
- Country: France

Physical characteristics
- Mouth: Saône
  - coordinates: 47.7654°N 6.0140°E
- Length: 25 km (16 mi)

Basin features
- Progression: Saône→ Rhône→ Mediterranean Sea

The Superbe is a 25-kilometre-long (16 mi) river in Haute-Saône in Bourgogne-Franche-Comté, eastern France. It rises in Fontenois-la-Ville and flows generally southwest to join the Saône at Baulay.
