= French ship Superbe (1814) =

Ship of the line of the French Navy

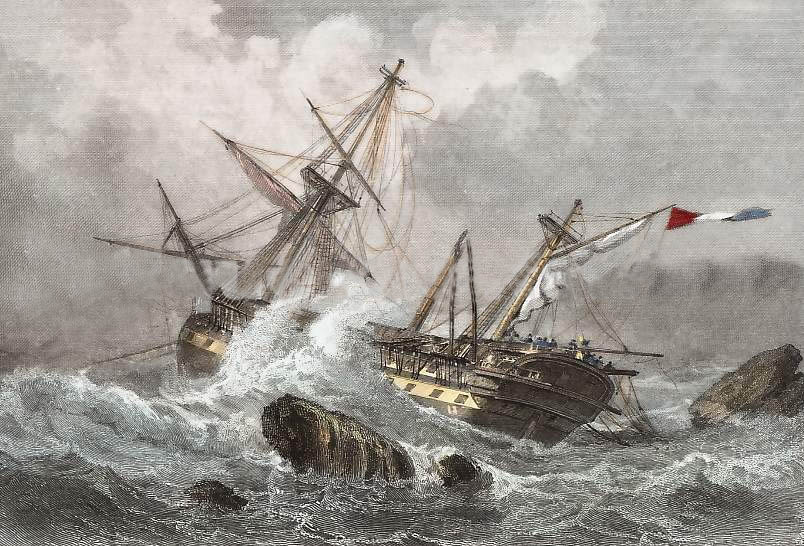
- Superbe wrecked at Paros, by J. Outhwaite

History

France
- Name: Superbe
- Namesake: Superb
- Builder: Antwerp
- Laid down: 23 August 1809
- Launched: 5 July 1814
- Fate: Wrecked 15 December 1833

General characteristics
- Class & type: Téméraire-class ship of the line
- Displacement: 3,069 tonneaux
- Tons burthen: 1,537 port tonneaux
- Length: 55.87 m (183 ft 4 in)
- Beam: 14.46 m (47 ft 5 in)
- Draught: 7.15 m (23.5 ft)
- Depth of hold: 7.15 m (23 ft 5 in)
- Sail plan: Full-rigged ship
- Crew: 705
- Armament: 74 guns: Lower gun deck: 28 × 36 pdr guns; Upper gun deck: 30 × 18 pdr guns; Forecastle and Quarterdeck: 16–28 × 8 pdr guns and 36 pdr carronades

Superbe was a 74-gun Téméraire-class ship of the line built for the French Navy during the 1810s. Completed in 1814, she played a minor role in the Napoleonic Wars.

== Description ==
Designed by Jacques-Noël Sané, the Téméraire-class ships had a length of 55.87 metres (183 ft 4 in), a beam of 14.46 metres (47 ft 5 in) and a depth of hold of 7.15 metres (23 ft 5 in). The ships displaced 3,069 tonneaux and had a mean draught of 7.15 metres (23 ft 5 in). They had a tonnage of 1,537 port tonneaux. Their crew numbered 705 officers and ratings during wartime. They were fitted with three masts and ship rigged.

The muzzle-loading, smoothbore armament of the Téméraire class consisted of twenty-eight 36-pounder long guns on the lower gun deck and thirty 18-pounder long guns on the upper gun deck. After about 1807, the armament on the quarterdeck and forecastle varied widely between ships with differing numbers of 8-pounder long guns and 36-pounder carronades. The total number of guns varied between sixteen and twenty-eight. The 36-pounder obusiers formerly mounted on the poop deck (dunette) in older ships were removed as obsolete.

== Construction and career ==
Superbe was built at Antwerp, in a late effort of the First French Empire to replenish the French Navy by using all available shipyards. Surviving construction records are contradictory with the ship either beginning construction in December 1808 and being named on 6 February 1809 or ordered and named on 26 January 1809 and construction beginning on 23 August. Either way she was launched on 5 September 1814, commissioned on 16 July and completed in September. Superbe was particularly well-built, to the point of being called the "nicest ship in the Navy", she became the only ship built at Antwerp to survive breaking up after the Bourbon Restoration. The ship served in the Caribbean before returning to Brest on 3 March 1815 to be put decommissioned on 25 March.

Superbe was recommissioned in 1830 to participate in the French invasion of Algiers, after which she returned to Toulon to be decommissioned again. In 1833, The ship served in the Mediterranean under Captain d'Oysonville. On 15 December, she was caught in a storm in the Aegean Sea off Paros and ran aground at the entrance of Parekia harbour. The survivors returned to Toulon on the frigates Iphigénie and Galathée and her sister ship Duquesne.
