= Gevigney-et-Mercey =

- Commune
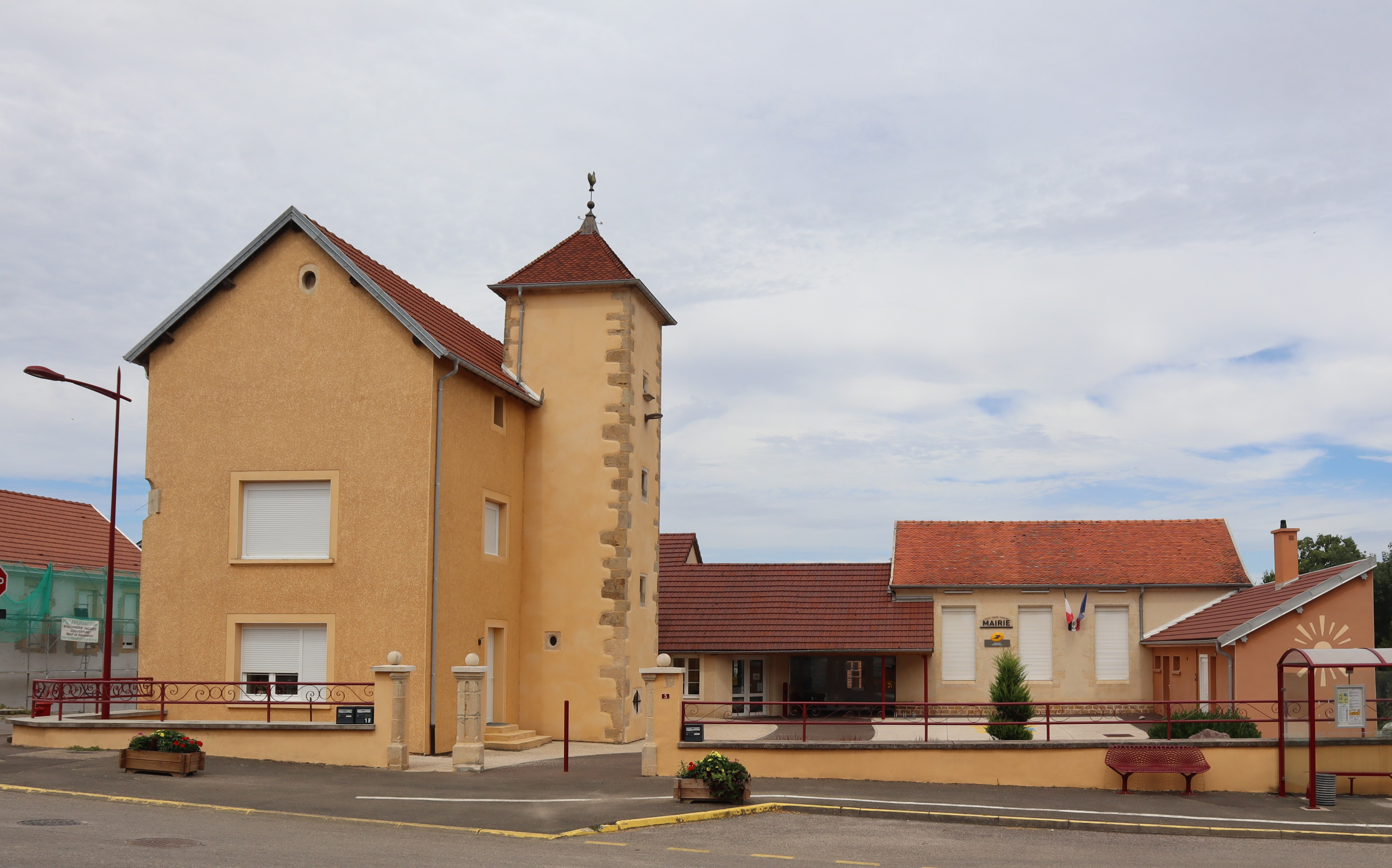
- Gevigney-et-Mercey Town hall

- Coat of arms
- Location of Gevigney-et-Mercey
- Location within France Location within Bourgogne-Franche-Comté
- Coordinates: 47°48′01″N 5°55′54″E
- Country: France
- Region: Bourgogne-Franche-Comté
- Department: Haute-Saône
- Arrondissement: Vesoul
- Canton: Jussey
- Area^{1}: 19.45 km^{2} (7.51 sq mi)
- Highest elevation: 283 m (928 ft)
- Lowest elevation: 212 m (696 ft)
- Population (2023): 532
  - Density: 27.4/km^{2} (70.8/sq mi)
- Time zone: UTC+01:00 (CET)
  - Summer (DST): UTC+02:00 (CEST)
- INSEE/Postal code: 70267 /70500
- ^{1} French Land Register data, which excludes lakes, ponds, glaciers > 1 km^{2} (0.386 sq mi or 247 acres) and river estuaries.

Gevigney-et-Mercey is a commune in the Haute-Saône department in the region of Bourgogne-Franche-Comté in eastern France.

== See also ==
- Communes of the Haute-Saône department
