= Thalie (river) =

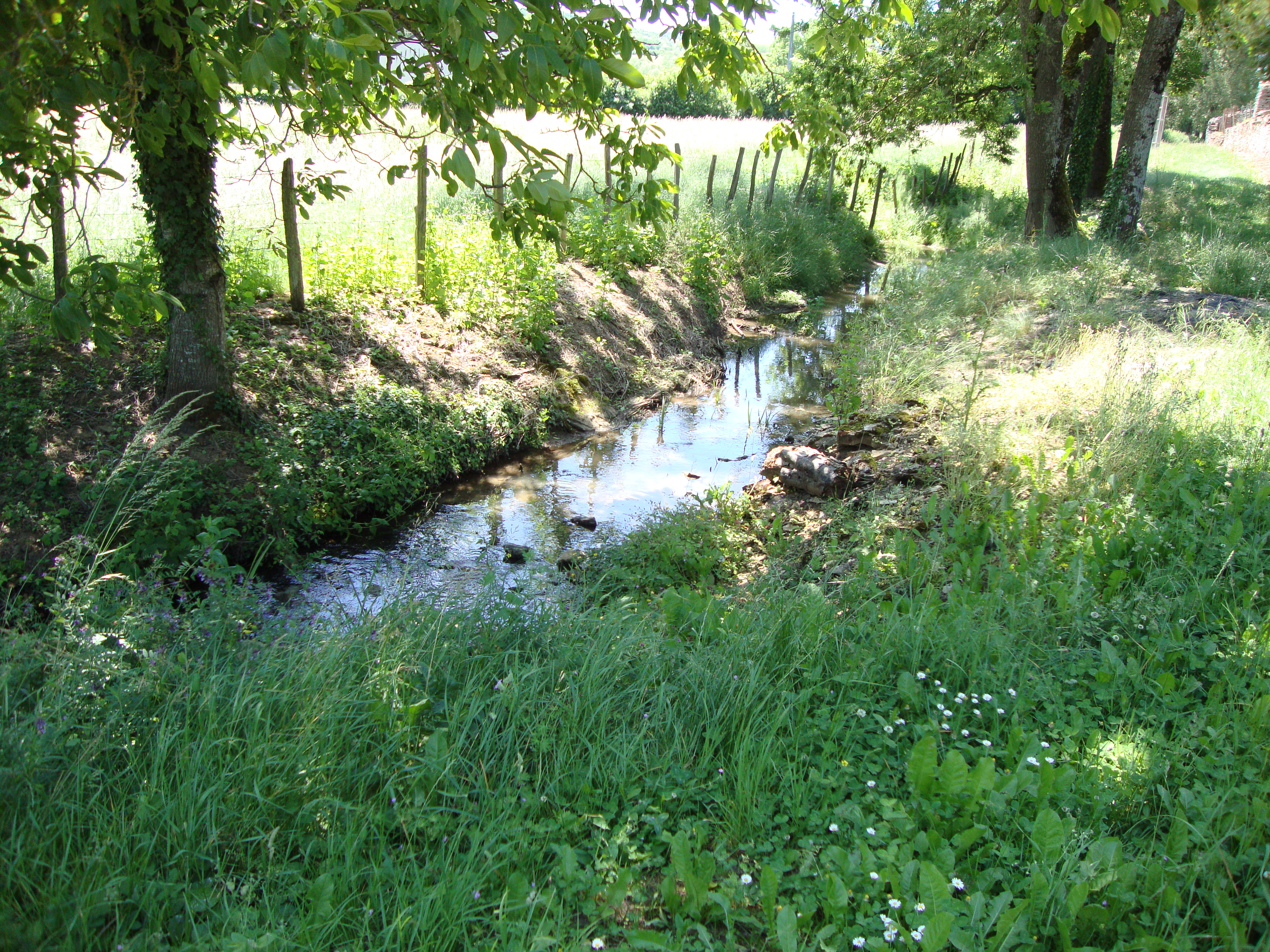
- The river at Eutonnoir, near its source

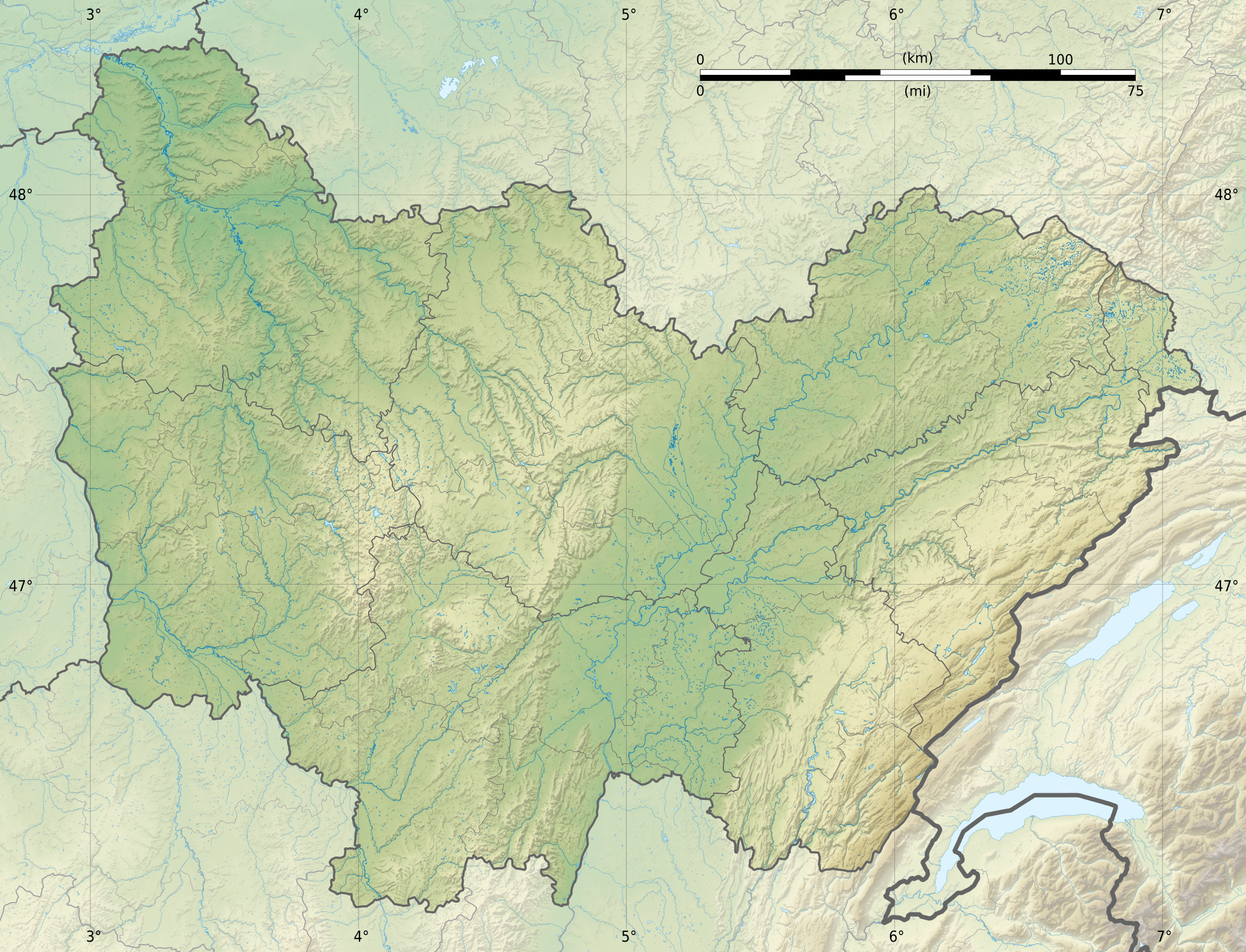
- Location within France Location within Bourgogne-Franche-Comté

Location
- Country: France

Physical characteristics
- Mouth: Corne
  - coordinates: 46.7595°N 4.8476°E
- Length: 30.4 km (18.9 mi)

Basin features
- Progression: Corne→ Saône→ Rhône→ Mediterranean Sea

The Thalie (or Talie) is a short river in Saône-et-Loire, France.

It rises at Rully and runs along Chalon-sur-Saône. After 30.4 km, at Saint-Rémy it joins the Corne, close to its confluence with the Saône.

It has an average discharge of 0.34 m³/s, and its tributaries are the ru Guillot, ruisseau du Bois and ruisseau de Guerlande.
