= HMS Superb (1736) =

Ship of the line of the Royal Navy

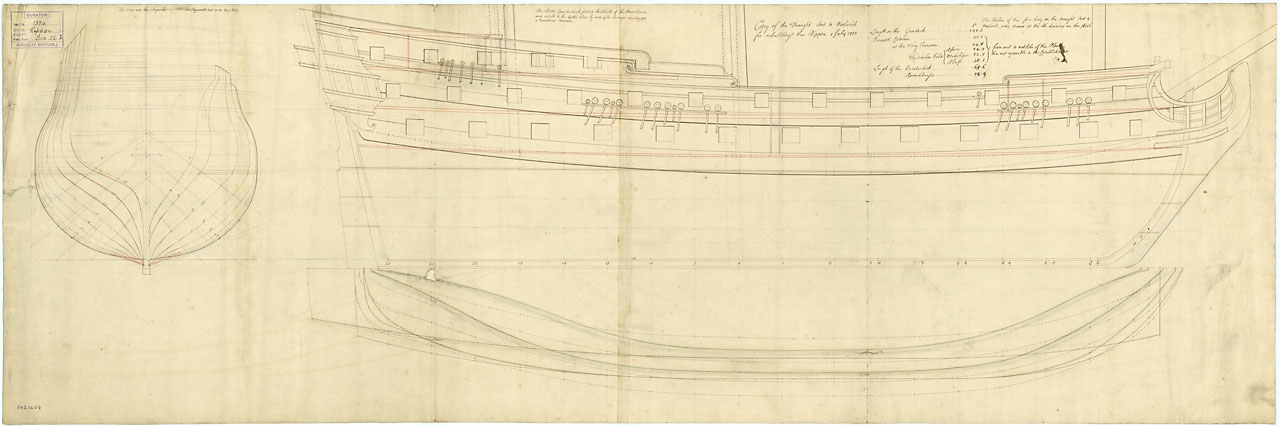
- Superb

History

Great Britain
- Name: HMS Superb
- Ordered: 4 September 1733
- Builder: Woolwich Dockyard
- Launched: 27 August 1736
- Fate: Broken up, 1757

General characteristics
- Class & type: 1733 proposals 60-gun fourth rate ship of the line
- Tons burthen: 1068
- Length: 144 ft (43.9 m) (gundeck)
- Beam: 41 ft 5 in (12.6 m)
- Depth of hold: 16 ft 11 in (5.2 m)
- Propulsion: Sails
- Sail plan: Full-rigged ship
- Armament: 60 guns: Gundeck: 24 × 24-pdrs; Upper gundeck: 26 × 9-pdrs; Quarterdeck: 8 × 6-pdrs; Forecastle: 2 × 6-pdrs

HMS Superb was a 60-gun fourth rate ship of the line of the Royal Navy, built to the 1733 proposals of the 1719 Establishment of dimensions at Woolwich Dockyard, and launched on 27 August 1736.

A collection of letters from Captain Thomas Sanders at the Navy Historical Center in Washington D. C. shows Superb took part in the siege of Louisbourg (1745) as the flagship of Commodore Peter Warren "Commanding His Majesty's Ships in the North Atlantic" under command of Captain Tiddeman.

Superb was broken up in 1757.
