= Ouge =

- Commune
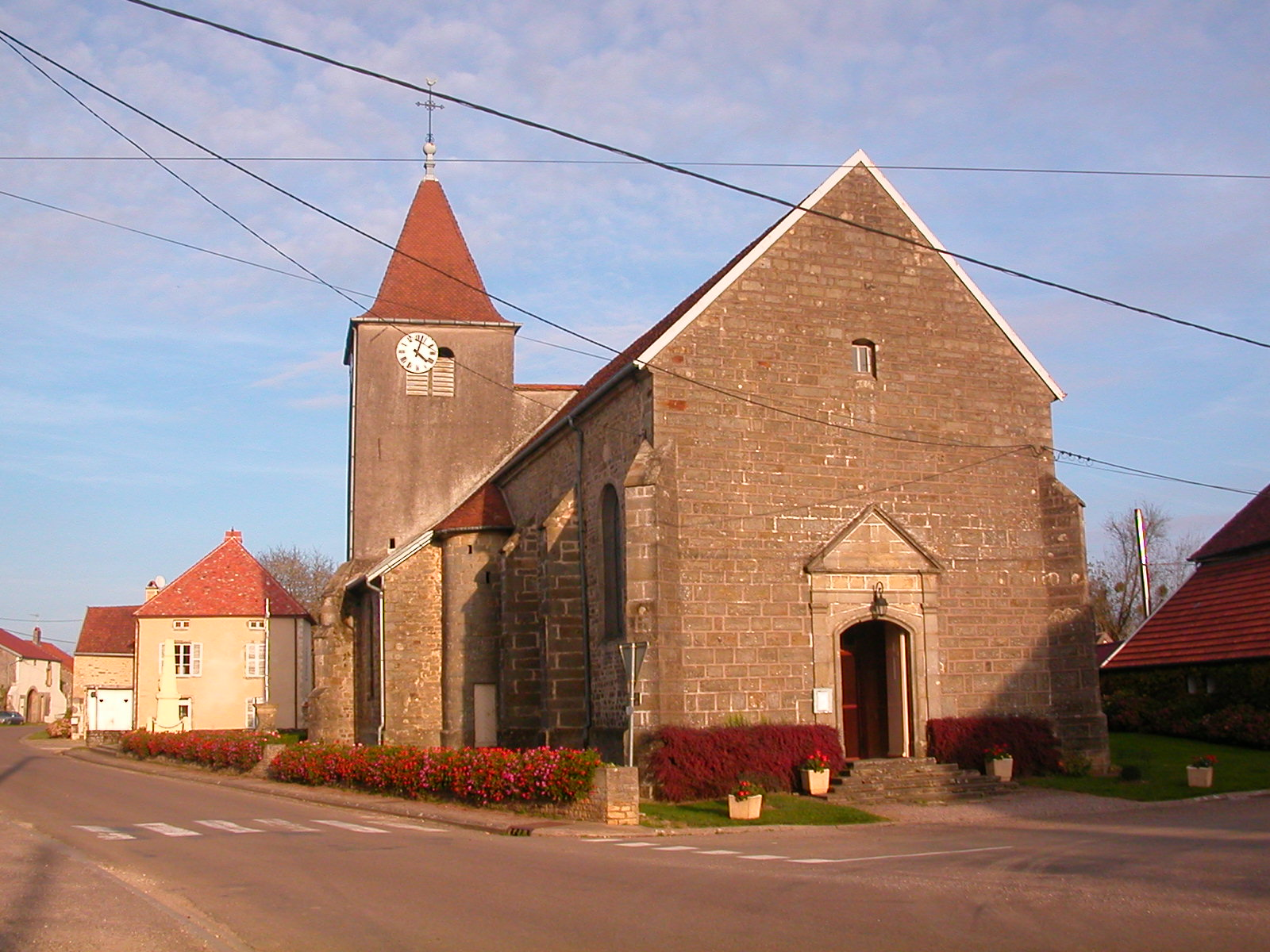
- The church in Ouge

- Coat of arms
- Location of Ouge
- Location within France Location within Bourgogne-Franche-Comté
- Coordinates: 47°47′47″N 5°42′16″E
- Country: France
- Region: Bourgogne-Franche-Comté
- Department: Haute-Saône
- Arrondissement: Vesoul
- Canton: Jussey

Government
  - Mayor (2024–2026): Jérôme Mennetrier
- Area^{1}: 13.49 km^{2} (5.21 sq mi)
- Highest elevation: 383 m (1,257 ft)
- Lowest elevation: 228 m (748 ft)
- Population (2023): 106
  - Density: 7.86/km^{2} (20.4/sq mi)
- Time zone: UTC+01:00 (CET)
  - Summer (DST): UTC+02:00 (CEST)
- INSEE/Postal code: 70400 /70500
- ^{1} French Land Register data, which excludes lakes, ponds, glaciers > 1 km^{2} (0.386 sq mi or 247 acres) and river estuaries.

Ouge (French pronunciation: [uʒ]) is a commune in the Haute-Saône department in the region of Bourgogne-Franche-Comté in eastern France.

== Points of interest ==
- Parc botanique du Château d'Ouge

== See also ==
- Communes of the Haute-Saône department
