= Superbus =

Superbus (Latin for superb, proud, arrogant) may refer to:

- Superbus (band), a French pop-rock band formed in 1999
- 18596 Superbus, a Main-belt asteroid discovered on January 21, 1998
- Lucius Tarquinius Superbus (before 535 BC – 496 BC), the seventh and last King of Rome, reigning from 535 until the Roman revolt in 509 BC
- Mount Superbus, Queensland's third highest peak at 1375 metres (4500 feet)
- Several bus industry companies, a play on super bus:
  - Superbus (company), an Israeli bus company
  - Superbus (transport), a project concerning the creation of high speed buses

== See also ==
- Superba (disambiguation)
