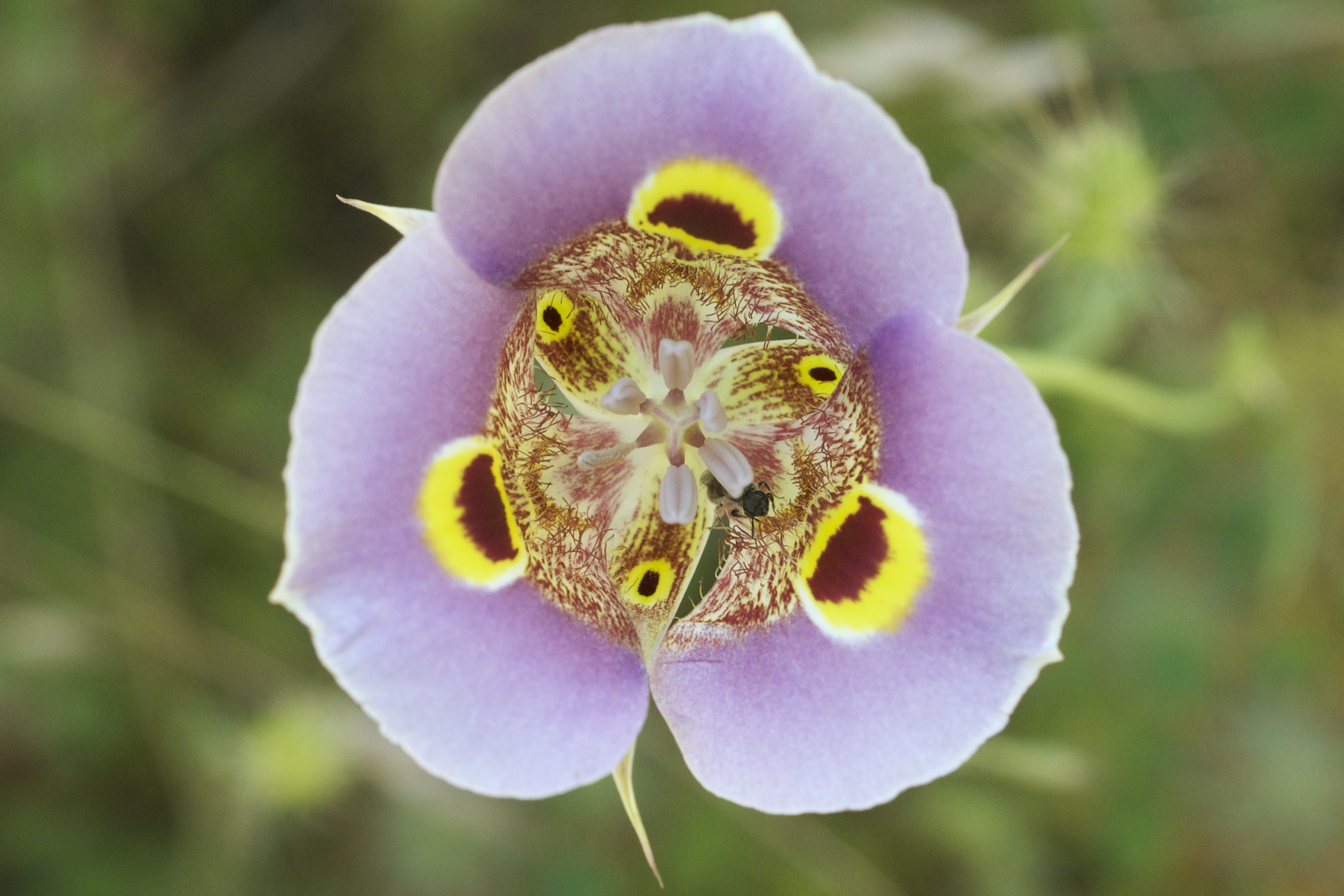

Conservation status
- Apparently Secure (NatureServe)

Scientific classification
- Kingdom: Plantae
- Clade: Tracheophytes
- Clade: Angiosperms
- Clade: Monocots
- Order: Liliales
- Family: Liliaceae
- Genus: Calochortus
- Species: C. superbus

Binomial name
- Calochortus superbus Purdy ex J.T.Howell

Synonyms
- Mariposa superba (Purdy ex Howell) Hoover; Calochortus venustus var. citrinus Baker; Calochortus venustus var. lilacinus Baker; Calochortus luteus var. citrinus (Baker) S.Watson; Calochortus luteus var. robustus Purdy; Calochortus superbus var. pratensis Purdy ex J.T.Howell; Calochortus pratensis (Purdy ex J.T.Howell) Hoover; Mariposa pratensis (Purdy ex J.T.Howell) Hoover

= Calochortus superbus =

Species of flowering plant

Calochortus superbus is a North American species of flowering plants in the lily family known by the common name superb mariposa lily. It is endemic to California, a common member of the flora in several types of habitat across much of the state. It is most abundant in the Coast Ranges and in the Foothills of the Sierra Nevada.

== Description ==
Calochortus superbus is a perennial herb growing up to 40 to 60 centimeters tall with a basal leaf up to 30 centimeters long, which withers by flowering. The inflorescence is a loose cluster of 1 to 3 erect, bell-shaped flowers. Each flower has three sepals and three petals all up to 4 centimeters long and blotched with yellow at the bases. There is generally a darker spot within the yellow area, and the base color of the segments may be white to light purple or solid yellow. The fruit is an angled capsule 5 or 6 centimeters long. This plant resembles Calochortus venustus, a chief discriminant being the oval to crescent shaped nectary of C. luteus compared to the squarish nectary of C. superbus.
