= Battle of the Tagus (1831) =

1831 battle of the Liberal Wars

- Part of the Liberal Wars
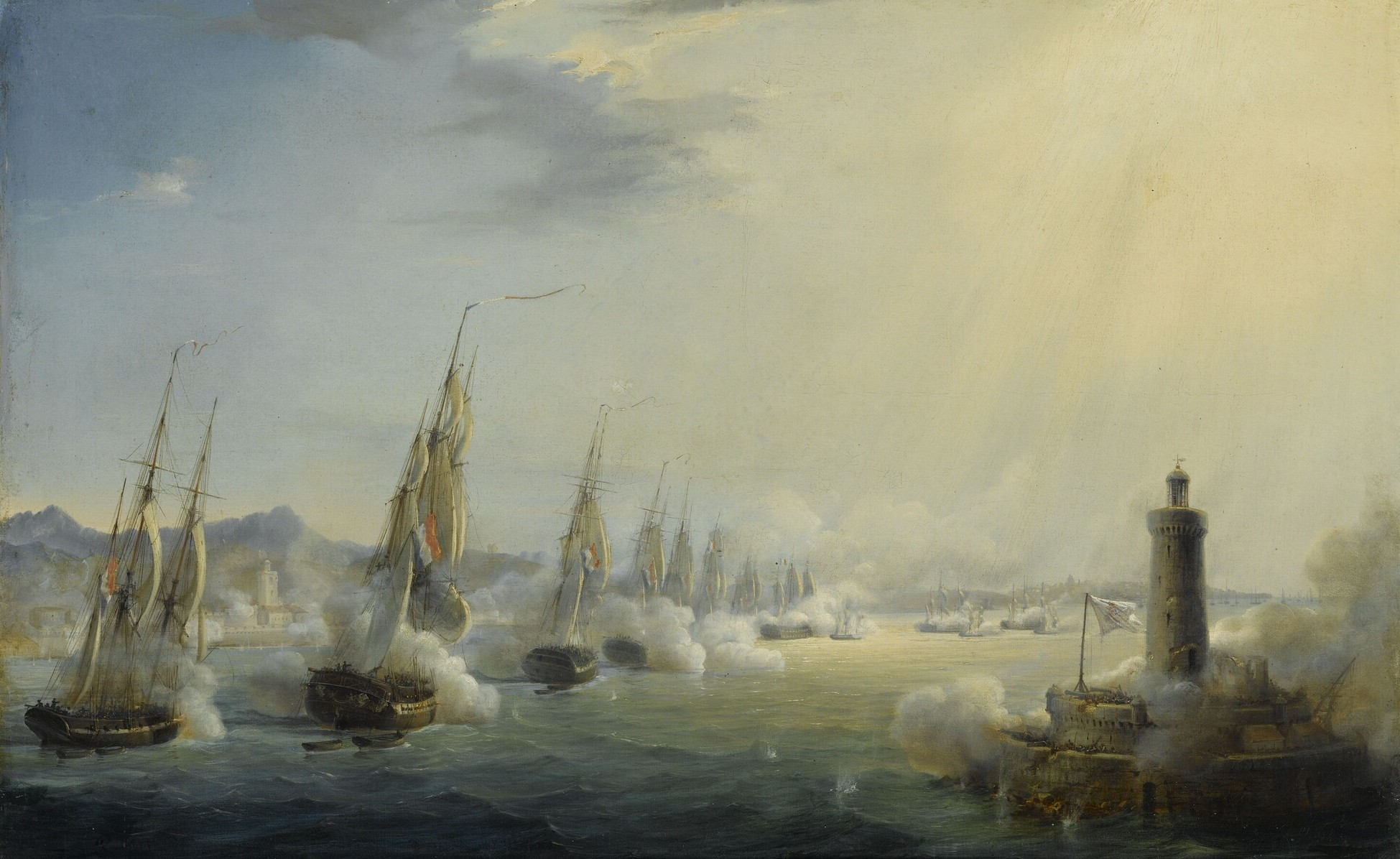
- 1850 painting of the battle
Date	11 July 1831
Location	Tagus, Portugal
Result	French victory

Belligerents
France	Miguelites

Commanders and leaders
Albin Roussin	Unknown

Strength
6 ships of the line 3 frigates 3 corvettes	1 ship of the line 3 frigates 3 corvettes 3 brigs 1 brigantine

Casualties and losses
3 killed 11 wounded	Unknown killed or wounded 1 ship of the line captured 3 frigates captured 3 corvettes captured 3 brigs captured 1 brigantine captured

The Battle of the Tagus took place on 11 July 1831 during the Liberal Wars. At the mouth of the Tagus river in Portugal, a French fleet attacked and subdued Miguelite fortifications with the aim of forcing the regime of Miguel I of Portugal to recognise the newly established July Monarchy in France. The damage to the forts defending access to the Tagus and the arrival of French warships at Lisbon forced Miguel's regime to cave in and comply with French demands.

== Background ==
The accession of King Miguel I to the throne of Portugal and abolition of the Constitutional Charter had put the country under the rule of an absolutist monarch. Liberals challenged his rule, and the struggle of the Liberal Wars ensued. The government of Miguel I was hostile to France, and became even more so when the popular insurrection of the July Revolution deposed the absolutist Bourbon King Charles X, and established a constitutional monarchy in which Louis-Philippe had become "King of the French". Miguel refused to recognise the Monarchy of July, while neither the French nor the British government recognised his.

In early 1831, a French citizen, Edmond Potentin Bonhomme was sentenced to public flogging, a fine and exile for allegedly profaning a church, a claim that French officials dismissed as "they had good reason to believe that many of the statements it comprehends, have no other foundation than the bigotry and malevolence of the Portuguese priesthood". Several other French citizen were similarly detained in what the French government judged to be arbitrary manners.

The French consul in Lisbon, Cassas, was tasked to present a diplomatic demarche to the Portuguese government, but he was rebuffed as not having the diplomatic credentials of an ambassador. Viscount d'Asseca requested a mediation of the British Foreign minister, Viscount Palmerston, who advised the Portuguese to comply with French demands. A squadron under Captain de Rabaudy, comprising the 60-gun frigate Melpomène and the 20-gun brig Endymion, under Nonay, was sent to the mouth of the Tagus river to show the flag and give weight to the demands of the French consul. They arrived on 16 March 1831. Upon her departure from Brest, Melpomène ran aground on Basse Beuzec, and had to double back, leaving Endymion to continue her route. When Melpomène finally arrived on 16 May 1831, Endymion was already returning to France, with the consul aboard. Rabaudy stated the purpose of his mission to Portuguese authorities and delivered the French ultimatum, demanding:

1. the release of the two imprisoned Frenchmen and the annulment of their sentence
2. an indemnity in their favour
3. destitution of the judges responsible
4. indemnities for a number of other Frenchmen
5. that Frenchmen be only arrested with the consent of a French judge, as was their privilege at the time.

These demands had to be met 48 hours after reception.

Portuguese authorities played for time. In consequence, Rabaudy's Melpomène started blockading Lisbon by preying upon shipping leaving and entering the Tagus, though their crew were immediately freed and sent ashore. Melpomène was soon reinforced by a squadron under Captain Charmasson, of the 52-gun Sirène, escorted by the 18-gun corvettes Diligente and Églé, and the 20-gun brig Hussard. While some of the ships cruised off the mouth of the Tagus, the others were detached to Azores to hunt for a Portuguese Miguelist division that blockaded the Liberal controlled Terceira Island; on 3 June, these ships captured the 24-gun corvette Urania and the 6-gun fluyt Oreste, but they failed to locate the rest of the Miguelist forces, and thus returned to the mouth of Tagus.

In spite of the French blockade and their undermining of its war effort against Liberals, the Portuguese government refused to meet French demands, and the treatment of the French prisoners even deteriorated. The French therefore decided to escalate the matter, and Henri de Rigny, French Minister of the Navy, appointed Counter-admiral Albin Roussin the commander of a squadron of six ships of the line. Roussin was a veteran of the Mauritius campaign of 1809–1811, and had been rewarded for his conduct at the Battle of Grand Port.

== Battle ==
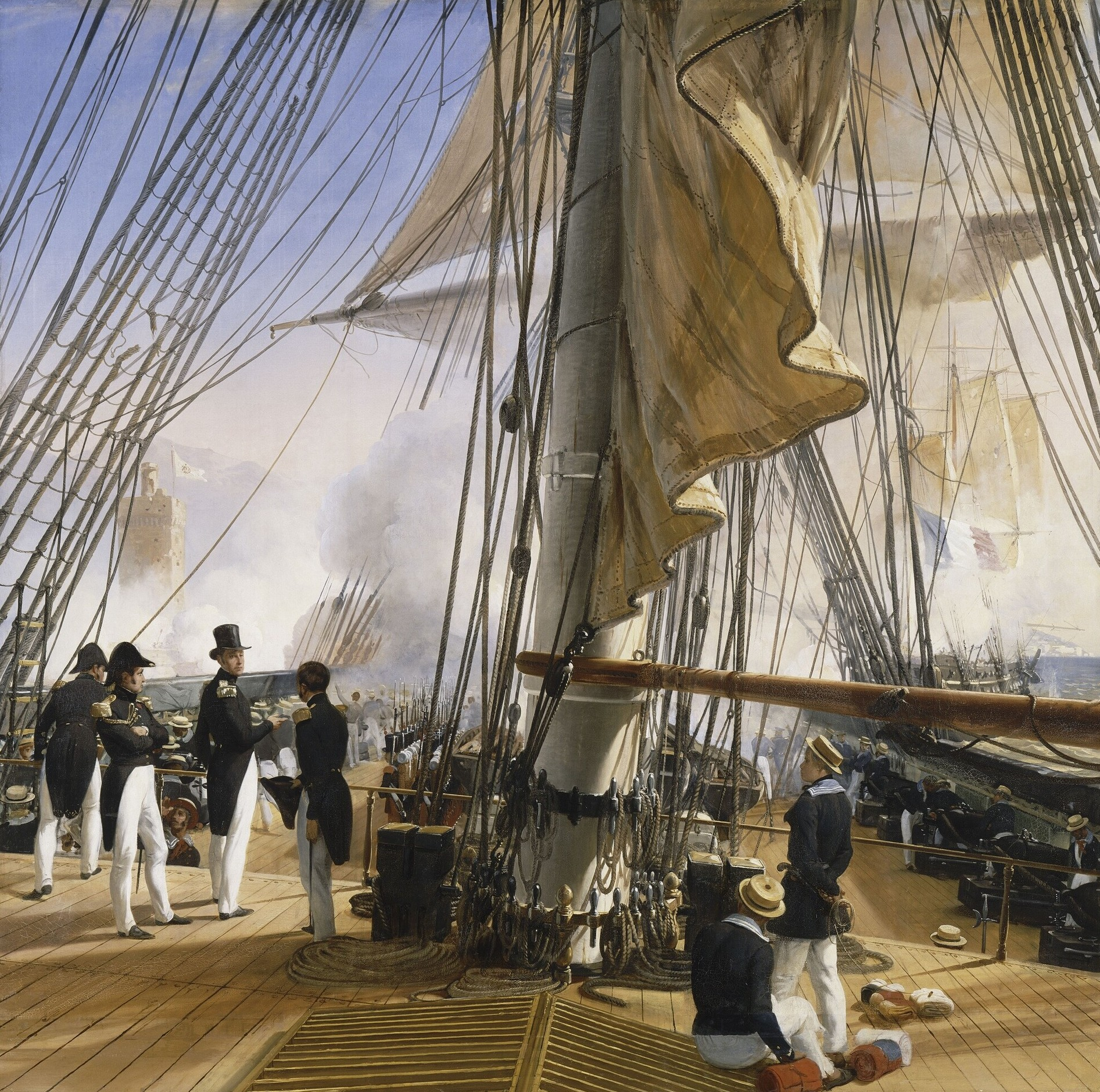
The French fleet forcing the entrance of the Tagus (Horace Vernet, 1840)

The mission of Rear-admiral Roussin was to sail to Tagus, with his flag on the 90-gun Suffren, and give the Portuguese authorities an ultimatum that demanded, in addition to that already given by Rabaudy, that the chief of the Portuguese police be dismissed; that all court sentences against French citizens be annulled; and that indemnities be paid to compensate for the costs induced by the expedition. The ultimatum expired 48 hours from reception, at which point the French forces would force the entrance of the Tagus, sail to Lisbon and bombard the city. Departed from Brest, the squadron arrived off the Tagus on 25 June, and stayed there waiting for the division inbound from Toulon, under Rear-admiral Hugon.

On 31, the Portuguese government mobilised the warships on the Tagus, though only two frigates and smaller warships could be marshaled at once; the strongest asset on Tagus, the 74-gun Dom João VI, needed over a month's worth of repairs, and the 52-gun frigate Amazona could not be readied before twenty days. This left only the 54-gun Diana and the 44-gun Pérola, with the 26-gun Dom João I and Lealdade, to oppose the much stronger French squadron. In addition, all the ships that the Portuguese could muster were much under-crewed. The condition deteriorated on 1 July when Suffren and Melpomène chased the Lord Wellington, a Portuguese merchantman inbound from Bahia; Lord Wellington fled under Fort Santo António to benefit from its protection. When the French ship approached, the fort opened fire, and a gunnery exchange broke out while the ships' boats were launched and captured the merchantman. The French bombardment silenced the fort, killing five or six soldiers, and severely wounding thirty.

On 6, Hugon's squadron arrived from Toulon. Being forced to inaction by unfavourable winds, Roussin attempted a last diplomatic demarche and on 10, he sent the 18-gun brig Dragon, under Commander Théodore Deloffre, (Note: The House of Commons papers, p. 313, erroneously spell his name as "Theodore Delaffre") to present a last ultimatum; Dragon also carried letters for the ships of the Tagus and for foreign diplomatic missions in Lisbon, and was under strict orders not to remain at anchor more than 24 hours. The new ultimatum comprised the same condition as the first, but added that the Portuguese government should compensate France for the price of the naval expedition, and threatened of a "de facto war". Dragon returned to the French fleet the next day with a refusal, though Santarem attempted to surrender his French prisoners to the British as a token concession. Captain Vincent Moulac, of Algésiras, advised that the fleet attempt to force the entrance of the river and sail upstream to Lisbon.

On 11, the winds had turned, and a North-North-West wind allowed for the expedition upstream. The French squadron manoeuvred to form a line of battle, and at 13:30, it sailed into the Southern pass. The French squadron sailed one by one in front of the forts, delivering broadsides at distances varying from 100 to 1000 metres, and reached Paço de Arcos in good order and with no serious damage. Roussin signaled his ships to sail on, but the two lead ships, Marengo and Algésiras, failed to spot the signals and dropped their anchor, as was initially planned to repair damage sustained during the forcing of the pass; seeing that the flagship Suffren sailed before them without stopping, they promptly put to sail and took a place in the French line, but this mistake put Suffren at the front of the line.

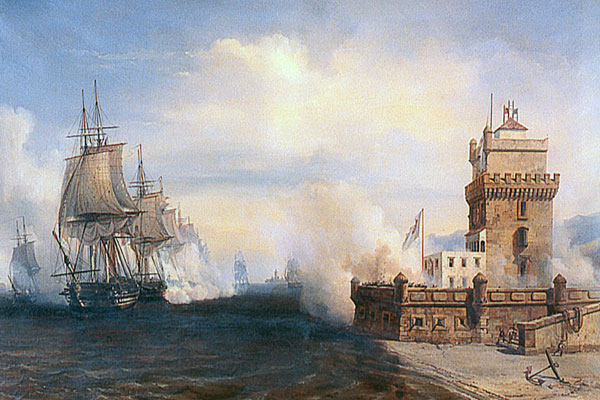
The flagship Suffren, leading French line of battle, exchanges broadsides with Belém Tower moments before breaking into Lisbon.

Around 16:00, Suffren opened fire on the Belém Tower at a distance of 100 metres, soon followed by the rest of the squadron, and anchored in front of the Belém Palace while the other ships and frigates sailed on to the anchored Portuguese fleet. When the lead ship, Pallas, opened fire on the Portuguese squadron, all its ships struck, without firing a shot.

By 17:00, the entire French squadron was anchored before the docks of Lisbon, and Roussin sent his chief of staff, Lieutenant commander Charles Ollivier, to present the French ultimatum once again with a 2-hour delay. The Portuguese government attempted once again to turn its prisoners over to British officials, but the offer was once again refused. The Portuguese government caved in, and a treaty was signed on 14 July on Suffren by Castello Branco and Roussin, with its dispositions published in the Lisbon Gazette on 15, and the sums of money begin paid in cash by the 23. With the ultimatum accepted by the Portuguese, Roussin sent most of the squadron to sea, staying in front of Lisbon with only Suffren, Pallas and Melpomène; the 58-gun frigate Guerrière, under Captain Kerdrain, rejoined him on 29.

=== Squadrons ===
Captain Rabaudy's squadron
Ship	Rate	Guns	Navy	Commander	Casualties			Notes
Ship	Rate	Guns	Navy	Commander	Killed	Wounded	Total	Notes
Melpomène	First class frigate	60		Captain Rabaudy				
Endymion	Brig	20		Commander Nonay				
No casualties
Sources: Troude, p. 270

Rear admiral Roussin's Squadron
Ship	Rate	Guns	Navy	Commander	Casualties			Notes
Ship	Rate	Guns	Navy	Commander	Killed	Wounded	Total	Notes
Marengo	Ship of the line	74		Captain Maillard Liscourt	–	-	-	
Algésiras	Ship of the line	80		Captain Vincent Moulac	–	-	-	
Suffren	Ship of the line	90		Rear-admiral Baron Albin Roussin; Captain Trotel	–	-	-	Flagship
Ville de Marseille	Ship of the line	74		Captain Baron Lasusse	–	-	-	
Trident	Ship of the line	74		Rear-admiral Baron Hugon; Captain Casy	–	-	-	Flag of Rear-admiral Baron Hugon
Alger	Ship of the line	74		Captain Jacques Leblanc	–	-	-	
Pallas	First rank frigate	60		Captain Forsans	–	-	-	
Melpomène	First rank frigate	60		Captain de Rabaudy	–	-	-	
Didon	First rank frigate	60		Captain Armand Buchet de Châteauville	–	-	-	
Diligente	Corvette	18		Commander François Halley	–	-	-	
Églé	Corvette	18		Commander Constant Raffy	–	-	-	
Perle	Corvette	18		Commander Douglas (Note: Roche, p. 348, suggest that the name could have been Douglas or Jouglas.)	–	-	-	
Hussard	Brig	20		Commander Thoulon	–	-	-	
Dragon	Brig	18		Commander Deloffre	–	-	-	
Endymion	Brig	18		Commander Nonay	–	-	-	
3 killed, 11 wounded
Sources: Troude, p. 274

Portuguese fleet in the Tagus
Ship	Rate	Guns	Navy	Commander	Casualties			Notes
Ship	Rate	Guns	Navy	Commander	Killed	Wounded	Total	Notes
Dom João VI	Ship of the line	74						In need for heavy repair. Unseaworthy at the time of the battle. Captured, not taken by the French as in too poor a condition. Returned to the Portuguese government.
Diana	Frigate	54						Taken into French service as Diane
Pérola	Frigate	46						Taken into French service as Perle
Amazona	Frigate	42						Unseaworthy at the time of the battle. Taken into French service as Amazone
Dom João I	Corvette	24						Taken into French service as Dom João I
Lealdade	Corvette	24						
Dom Pedro	Corvette	18						Taken into French service as Dom Pedro
Fevereira	Brig	10						
Glória	Brig	10						
Infante Sebastião (or Dom Sebastião)	Brig	10						
Memória	Brigantine	6						
Casualties "trifling"
Sources: Troude, p. 273

Key

- A † symbol indicates that the officer was killed during the action or subsequently died of wounds received.
- The ships are ordered in the sequence in which they formed up for battle.

== Aftermath ==
The treaty of 14 July specified that the French would return the ships captured before the attack on the Tagus, including the warships Orestes and Urania and the merchantmen with their cargo. After a council of war on Trident, the French decided to also return the captured 74-gun Dom João VI as, being neither armed nor manned during the action, she did not belong to an opposing force.

Nothing was said, however, of the fleet captured at Lisbon itself. The Portuguese government protested, and Roussin proposed that the ships be re-purchased for 1.5 million cruzados, or to return half the captured ships, in exchange for the release of 400 political prisoners. When this offer was rejected, the ships in question were incorporated in the French fleet.

The French squadron of Toulon departed on 25; the prizes Diana, Amazone, Don João I and Don Pedro departed with on 12 with a brig, and the next day Perola, Lealdade, Saint Sebastian and Memoria followed. The rest of the fleet eventually departed for Brest on 14 August, where it arrived on 4 September, leaving only Melpomène and Églé.

In recognition for the deed, Roussin was promoted to Vice-admiral.

The Miguelists would suffer a crushing defeat at the hands of the Liberals at the Battle of Cape St. Vincent two years later, ending the reign of Miguel I.

== Notes and references ==
=== Bibliography ===
- Roche, Jean-Michel (2005). Dictionnaire des bâtiments de la flotte de guerre française de Colbert à nos jours, 1671–1870. Group Retozel-Maury Millau. ISBN 978-2-9525917-0-6. OCLC 165892922.
- Troude, Onésime-Joachim (1867). Batailles navales de la France. Vol. 4. Challamel ainé. pp. 160–162.
- Levot, Prosper (1866). Les gloires maritimes de la France: notices biographiques sur les plus célèbres marins. Bertrand.
- House of Commons papers. Vol. 20. Parliament. House of Commons. 1831.
