= Pénaud =

Pénaud or Penaud is a French surname, and may refer to:

== People ==
- Alain Penaud (born 1969), French rugby union player
- Alphonse Pénaud (1850–1880), French pioneer of aviation design and engineering
- Charles Pénaud (1800–1864), French naval officer who rose to the rank of vice-amiral
- Damian Penaud (born 1996), French rugby union player.

== Other ==
- Mount Pénaud, mountain in the Chavdar Peninsula, Graham Land, Antarctica
