= Vincent Moulac =

French naval officer and privateer

Vincent-Marie Moulac (French pronunciation: [vɛ̃sɑ̃ maʁi mulak]; Lorient, 22 March 1778 – Callao, 5 April 1836) was a French naval officer and privateer.

== Career ==
Moulac volunteered as a boy in 1790, aged 12, and sailed with merchantmen to Ile de France. He then served on the 74-gun Thémistocle. In 1793, promoted to helmsman, he served on Orion.

In 1794, he was promoted to midshipman and appointed to the frigate Bellone. In May 1796, he served on the privateer Morgant, which was captured by the British in June. Moulac was detained for two years before being released. By the Peace of Lunéville in 1801, he was serving on the frigate Uranie, but as he was only an auxiliary officer, he could not maintain his appointment and had to sail to commerce.

He later served as a first lieutenant on the privateer Frères Unis, only to be captured again on 27 April 1804.

A few months later, he was recruited by Robert Surcouf to serve as first officer on his privateer Caroline, under Nicolas Surcouf.

In 1805, Moulac was promoted to Ensign in the Navy. He served as first officer on Surcouf's privateer Revenant, under Captain Joseph Potier, and took part in the capture of the Portuguese Conceçáo-de-Santo-Antonio. and appointed to the Iéna. On 8 October 1808, Iéna as captured off the Sandheads of Bengal river, by the 44-gun HMS Modeste, under Captain George Elliot, after a 9-hour chase and a 2hour and a half fight.

Released, he was appointed second officer on Minerve, under Pierre Bouvet. He took part in the Battle of Grand Port, where he captained the Indiaman Ceylon, previously captured by the French and was twice wounded. He was again taken prisoner at the Invasion of Île de France in December 1810.

Release in November 1811 and promoted to Lieutenant, he was appointed to Clorinde, under Commander René Joseph Marie Denis-Lagarde, and was once again captured when Clorinde, after fighting a bitter but indecisive battle against HMS Eurotas, was captured in a disabled state by HMS Dryad and Achates.

In January 1817, Moulac was given command of the 22-gun corvette Bayardère for a hydrography mission off Africa. In January 1817, he took part in slave trading repression, commanding the brig Écureuil off Senegal.

In 1822, he was promoted to Commander, and appointed as first officer on the Flore.

In 1825, he took command of the fluyt Durance, transporting Egyptian antiques, and the corvette Diligente in 1828.

Promoted to Captain, he was given command of the hospital frigate Armide. He was then appointed to captain the 80-gun Algésiras, taking part in the Battle of the Tagus where he was the one to advise attempting to force the forts and sail upstream to Lisbon.

In 1833, he was appointed to the frigate Melpomène, and the next year, to Flore.

He died of unknown causes on 5 April 1836 in Callao harbour.

== Sources and references ==
=== Bibliography ===
- Fonds Marine. Campagnes (opérations; divisions et stations navales; missions diverses). Inventaire de la sous-série Marine BB4. Tome deuxième : BB4 1 à 482 (1790-1826)
- Roche, Jean-Michel (2005). Dictionnaire des bâtiments de la flotte de guerre française de Colbert à nos jours. Vol. 1. Group Retozel-Maury Millau. ISBN 978-2-9525917-0-6. OCLC 165892922.
- Troude, Onésime-Joachim (1867). Batailles navales de la France (in French). Vol. 3. Challamel ainé.
- Troude, Onésime-Joachim (1867). Batailles navales de la France (in French). Vol. 4. Challamel ainé.
- Taillemite, Étienne. Dictionnaire des Marins Français.
- Levot, Prosper (1866). Les gloires maritimes de la France: notices biographiques sur les plus célèbres marins (in French). Bertrand.
- Cunat, Charles (1857). Saint-Malo illustré par ses marins (in French). Imprimerie de F. Péalat.
