= Charles Pénaud =

French naval officer

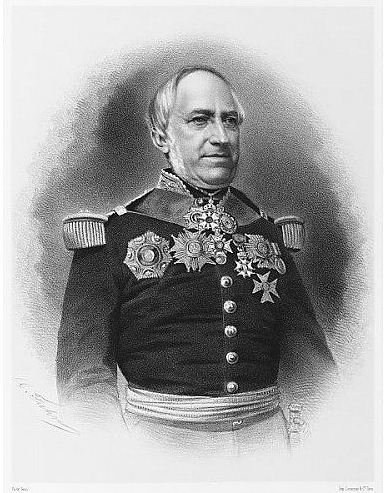

Personal details
- Born: 24 December 1800 Brest, Finistère, France
- Died: 25 March 1864 (aged 63) Toulon, Var, France
- Occupation: Naval officer

Charles Pénaud (24 December 1800 – 25 March 1864) was a French naval officer who rose to the rank of vice-admiral. As a young officer he was a member of the voyage of exploration and circumnavigation of Hyacinthe de Bougainville in 1824–26. In 1831 he participated in the Battle of the Tagus. He commanded a corvette during the French blockade of the Río de la Plata in 1838–40. During the Crimean War he was second in command of the Baltic Squadron and engaged in the Battle of Bomarsund in 1854. The next year, as commander of the Baltic Squadron, he bombarded Sveaborg. After the return of peace he was a member of the Admiralty Council and then president of the Naval Council of Works. In this role he was responsible for successful trials of the new steam-powered armoured warships.

== Early years (1800–38) ==
Charles Pénaud was born on 24 December 1800 in Brest, Finistère. His father was an officer of the imperial navy who retired early due to his wounds. He was the oldest of three brothers who joined the navy and held high ranks. His brothers were André-Édouard Pénaud^{(fr)}, who became a vice admiral, and Pierre-Alphonse Pénaud^{(fr)}, who became chief inspector of the Naval administrative services.

Charles Pénaud joined the navy at the age of 14 as a mousse (cabin boy). His first voyage was to the Antilles on the Lys under the command of a friend of his father. The Lys was sent to retake possession of the island of Martinique after the Bourbon Restoration, along with the frigate Érigone and the corvette Vésuve. The squadron arrived at Fort Royal on 5 October 1814. Pénaud was named aspirant 2nd class on 1 July 1817. He made a voyage to the Antilles on the frigate Revanche, then to India on the fluyt Galo under captain Ange René Armand, baron de Mackau.

Pénaud became aspirant 1st class on 1 January 1819. He left the Galo, which returned to France. For five years Pénaud commanded various avisos based on the island of Réunion. During this period he undertook several delicate missions on the coast of Madagascar and in the Bay of Bengal. Two colonial governors reported favorably on his performance to the Minister of Marine. Pénaud was promoted to enseigne de vaisseau (ensign) on 9 January 1822. He was in Reunion in 1824 when the mission of exploration of baron Hyacinthe de Bougainville arrived. He obtained permission to join this expedition on the corvette Espérance, and at the end of the circumnavigation returned to France in 1826 after eight years' absence.

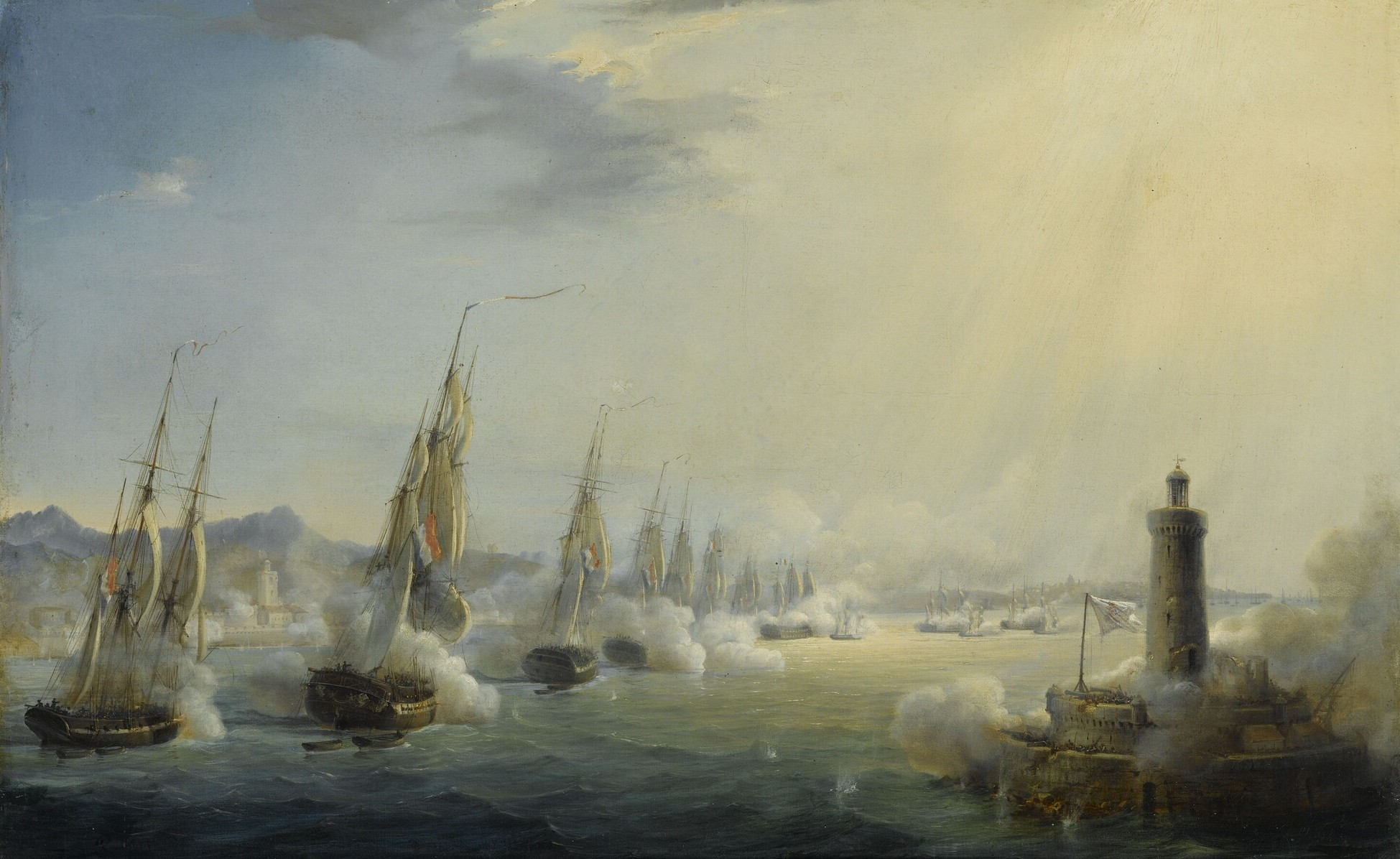
Battle of the Tagus in 1831 by Pierre-Julien Gilbert

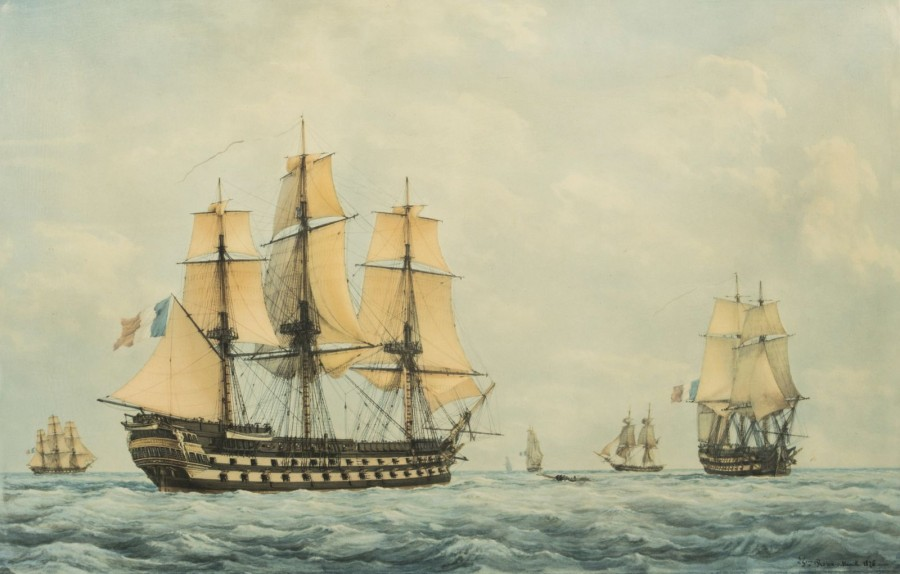
Ville de Marseille by François Geoffroi Roux

In 1827 Pénaud embarked on the frigate Vestale on a mission in the Mediterranean. In 1828 he was on the frigate Amazone on the Antilles station, where he was promoted to lieutenant de vaissau (ship-of-the-line lieutenant) on 31 December 1828. He assisted in the Invasion of Algiers in 1830 on the Provence, where he was orderly officer for Admiral Guy-Victor Duperré. In 1831 he was second in command of the Ville de Marseille, one of six vessels under the command of Admiral Albin Roussin that forced the entrance of the Tagus under the fire of Portuguese batteries. For this action on 20 August 1831 he was named Knight of the Legion of Honour. From 1833 to 1837 he commanded in turn the xebec Chamois at Toulon and the corvette Béarnaise on the French Guiana station.

== Captain (1838–53) ==
Pénaud became capitaine de frégate (frigate captain) on 28 August 1838. For two years he commanded the corvette Triomphante, in which he participated in the French blockade of the Río de la Plata. He saw action several times in the Paraná River. He was warmly recommended for promotion by Admiral de Mackau, his former captain on the Galo. He returned to Brest in the Triomphante, which he continued to command on a mission to Senegal, Cayenne and the Antilles.

Pénaud was promoted to capitaine de vaisseau (ship-of-the-line captain) on 28 November 1842. Soon after he was given command of the frigate Charte and assigned to the Pacific and Oceania station. Contre-amiral Armand Joseph Bruat, governor of French possessions in the Pacific, wrote to the government of the strong assistance he had given, particularly at Mahina in the struggle against the insurgent Tahitians. Charte returned to France in 1845, and during that year Pénaud was in turn captain of the Neptune and the Ièna in the training squadron. On 9 February 1846 he was named Officer of the Legion of Honour.

After the February Revolution of 1848 Pénaud was removed from active service for two years. During this period he was a member of the navy council of works. In 1850 he was named commander in chief of the West Coast of Africa station on the frigate Eldorado. At that time slavery was illegal, but traders were openly taking Africans as "passengers" to work as "domestic servants" in Brazil, where they were sold as slaves. On 1 November 1850 Penault wrote supplementary instructions to commanders of the cruisers of the French squadron on slavery requiring them to seize any French boats they found engaged in this practice. On the Eldorado he undertook a dangerous expedition in the Casamance River. On 25 March 1851 Penaud concluded a treaty with the chiefs of Samatit under which they recognized the suzerainty of France. On 8 May 1852 he was named Commander of the Legion of Honour.

== Admiral (1853–64) ==
Pénaud was promoted to contre-amiral (rear admiral) on 11 June 1853. He was appointed by Théodore Ducos, Minister of Marine, as the minister's cabinet director and chief of staff. In 1854 he was made second in command of the Baltic squadron under Vice-Admiral Alexandre Ferdinand Parseval-Deschenes. At first he made the Duguesclin his flagship. In 1854 Antoine Marie Ferdinand de Maussion de Candé commanded the ship of the line Trident in the Baltic squadron and participated in the Battle of Bomarsund. During this engagement the Trident was Pénaud's flagship.

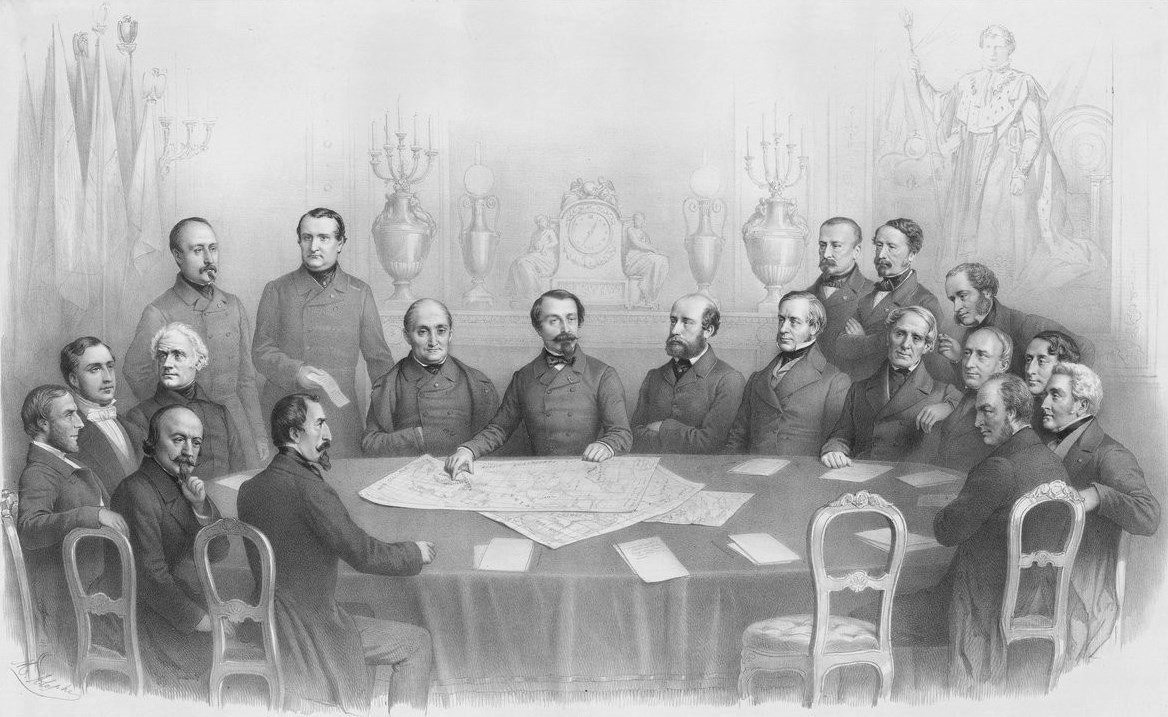
Napoleon III and his council of war in 1856. Pénaud is 4th from the right (4th from Napoleon's left).

The next year the Baltic fleet was reduced to three ships and several gunboats, and Pénaud was made commander in chief. He made the Tourville, a three-deck vessel with 110 guns, his flagship in the Baltic. Pénaud arrived in the Gulf of Finland in June 1855 with his ships and ten screw gunboats, where he joined the British Rear Admiral Richard Saunders Dundas. Dundas was hesitant but Penaud persuaded him to attack the Russian fleet in the harbour of Sveaborg on 9–10 August 1855. The British provided most of the attacking force. Much of the bombardment was done with smaller vessels that the shore batteries found hard to hit. Six Russians ships of the line and 17 smaller warships were destroyed, and the Russians suffered 2,000 casualties. The allies suffered one death, 15 wounded, and damage to only one British sloop. On 2 October 1855 Pénaud was promoted to Grand Officer of the Legion of Honour.

After returning to France Pénaud was sent to the Mediterranean to serve under Vice-Admiral François Thomas Tréhouart in repatriating the French Army from the Crimea. On 3 January 1856 he was made an honorary Knight of the British Order of the Bath. From 1856 to 1860 Pénaud was a member of the Admiralty Council, which he left to become president of the council of works for four years. Pénaud was promoted to vice-amiral on 7 November 1858.

In 1859 Pénaud was made president of a committee to study all aspects of construction of naval warships, and made his flagship the ironclad Solferino. The new armoured ships were tested in the last part of 1863. His former flagship, the Tourville, converted to a two-deck steamship with 82 guns and a crew of 850 men, took part in trials. There was much controversy over these ships due to their great weight and their long and low profiles, which it was thought would make them unmanageable. However, the trials were successful.

At the time of his death Pénaud was commander in chief of the Mediterranean training squadron. Pénaud died in Toulon on 25 March 1864 on board his flagship, the Ville de Paris, after a short illness. Following his wishes, the funeral avoided military pomp. (Note: Another source says his obsequies were observed with all the ceremony due to his rank on board the Ville de Paris, with musketry and artillery fire from the ships throughout the conveyance of his body to shore.) His body was taken to Paris and placed in the family sepulchre in Père Lachaise Cemetery.

== Sources ==
- Clercq, Alexandre Jehan Henry de (1866), Recueil des traites de la France (in French), Amyot
- Guérin, Léon (1858), Histoire de la dernière guerre de Russie (1853 - 1856) ... (in French), Dufour
- Ministère de la Marine (1864), "Le Vice-Amiral Charles Pénaud", Revue maritime et coloniale (in French), Ministère de la Marine et des Colonies
- Parti social français (27 March 1864), "Départements", Le Petit Journal (in French)
- "PENAUD, Charles", Base Léonore (in French), Archives nationales
- Pointel (1864), "Le vice-amiral Penaud", Le Monde Illustré (in French), Imp. de la Librairie Nouvelle
- Raymond, Xavier (1864), "La Campagne d'essais de l'escadre cuirassée", Revue des Deux Mondes (in French), 49
- Roche, Jean-Michel (2005), Dictionnaire des bâtiments de la flotte de guerre française de Colbert à nos jours, 1671–1870, Group Retozel-Maury Millau, p. 461, ISBN 978-2-9525917-0-6, OCLC 165892922
- Rouxel, Jean-Christophe; Jogerst, Gilles, Antoine Marie Ferdinand de MAUSSION de CANDÉ (in French)
- Samba, Isaac Mampuya (2018-04-20), Survival and Penalty of the Slave Trade from Gabon Until the Congo in 1840–1880: Volume Three, AuthorHouse UK, ISBN 978-1-5462-9189-3
- Shaw, William Arthur (1970), The Knights of England: A Complete Record from the Earliest Time to the Present Day of the Knights of All the Orders of Chivalry in England, Scotland, and Ireland, and of Knights Bachelors. Incorporating a Complete List of Knights Bachelors Dubbed in Ireland, Genealogical Publishing Com, ISBN 978-0-8063-0443-4
- Sondhaus, Lawrence (2012-10-12), Naval Warfare, 1815-1914, Routledge, ISBN 978-1-134-60994-9
- Sondhaus, Lawrence (2014-06-11), Navies of Europe, Routledge, ISBN 978-1-317-86978-8
