= French ship Marengo (1810) =

French ship of the line

- Scale model of Achille, sister ship of French ship Marengo (1810), on display at the Musée national de la Marine in Paris.

History

France
- Name: Marengo
- Namesake: Battle of Marengo
- Builder: Lorient shipyard
- Laid down: 18 September 1806
- Launched: 12 October 1810
- Renamed: Pluton 1866
- Stricken: 21 July 1858
- Fate: Broken, 1873

General characteristics
- Class & type: Téméraire-class ship of the line
- Displacement: 3,069 tonneaux
- Tons burthen: 1,537 port tonneaux
- Length: 55.87 m (183 ft 4 in)
- Beam: 14.46 m (47 ft 5 in)
- Draught: 7.15 m (23.5 ft)
- Depth of hold: 7.15 m (23 ft 5 in)
- Sail plan: Full-rigged ship
- Crew: 705
- Armament: 74 guns: Lower gun deck: 28 × 36 pdr guns; Upper gun deck: 30 × 18 pdr guns; Forecastle and Quarterdeck: 16–28 × 8 pdr guns and 36 pdr carronades

Marengo was a 74-gun Téméraire-class ship of the line built for the French Navy during the first decade of the 19th century. Completed in 1811, she played a minor role in the Napoleonic Wars.

== Description ==
Designed by Jacques-Noël Sané, the Téméraire-class ships had a length of 55.87 metres (183 ft 4 in), a beam of 14.46 metres (47 ft 5 in) and a depth of hold of 7.15 metres (23 ft 5 in). The ships displaced 3,069 tonneaux and had a mean draught of 7.15 metres (23 ft 5 in). They had a tonnage of 1,537 port tonneaux. Their crew numbered 705 officers and ratings during wartime. They were fitted with three masts and ship rigged.

The muzzle-loading, smoothbore armament of the Téméraire class consisted of twenty-eight 36-pounder long guns on the lower gun deck and thirty 18-pounder long guns on the upper gun deck. After about 1807, the armament on the quarterdeck and forecastle varied widely between ships with differing numbers of 8-pounder long guns and 36-pounder carronades. The total number of guns varied between sixteen and twenty-eight. The 36-pounder obusiers formerly mounted on the poop deck (dunette) in older ships were removed as obsolete.

== Construction and career ==
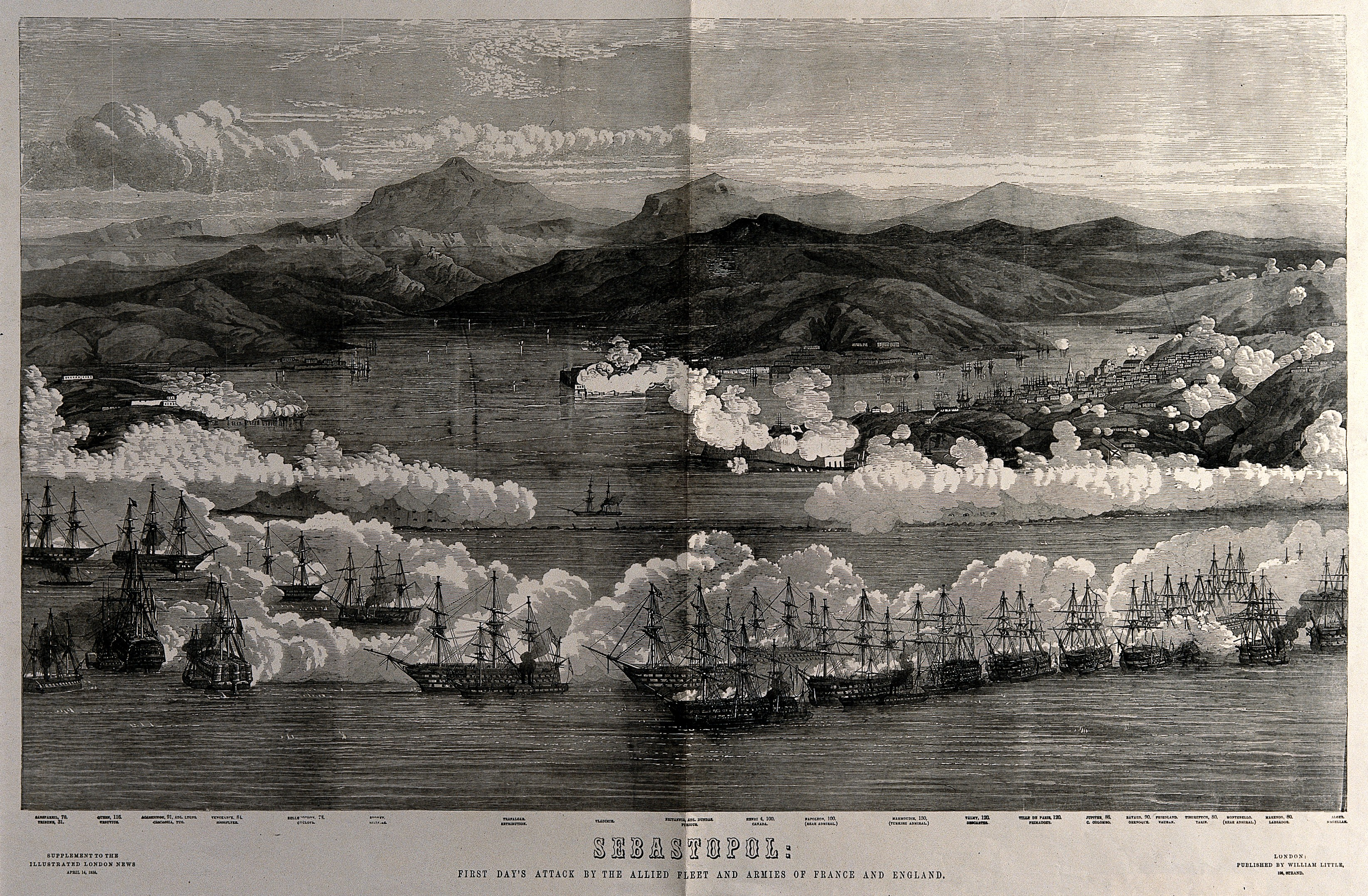
Marengo at Sebastopol, during the first day's attack by the allied fleet and armies of France and England on 17 October 1854

Marengo was ordered on 11 August 1806 and named on 19 July. The ship was laid down on 19 September 1809 at the Arsenal de Lorient and launched on 12 October 1810. The ship was completed in April 1811 and commissioned on 25 April. On 5 January 1813, she collided with the Tourville off Brest. In November 1814, under René Lemarant de Kerdaniel, she took part in the French repossession of Guadeloupe and Martinique.

She took part in the Invasion of Algiers in 1830, and in the Battle of the Tagus under Captain Maillard Liscourt the next year. In 1854, she took part in the Crimean War. She was struck on 21 July 1858 and was used as a prison hulk from 1860 to 1865. In 1866, she was renamed Pluton.

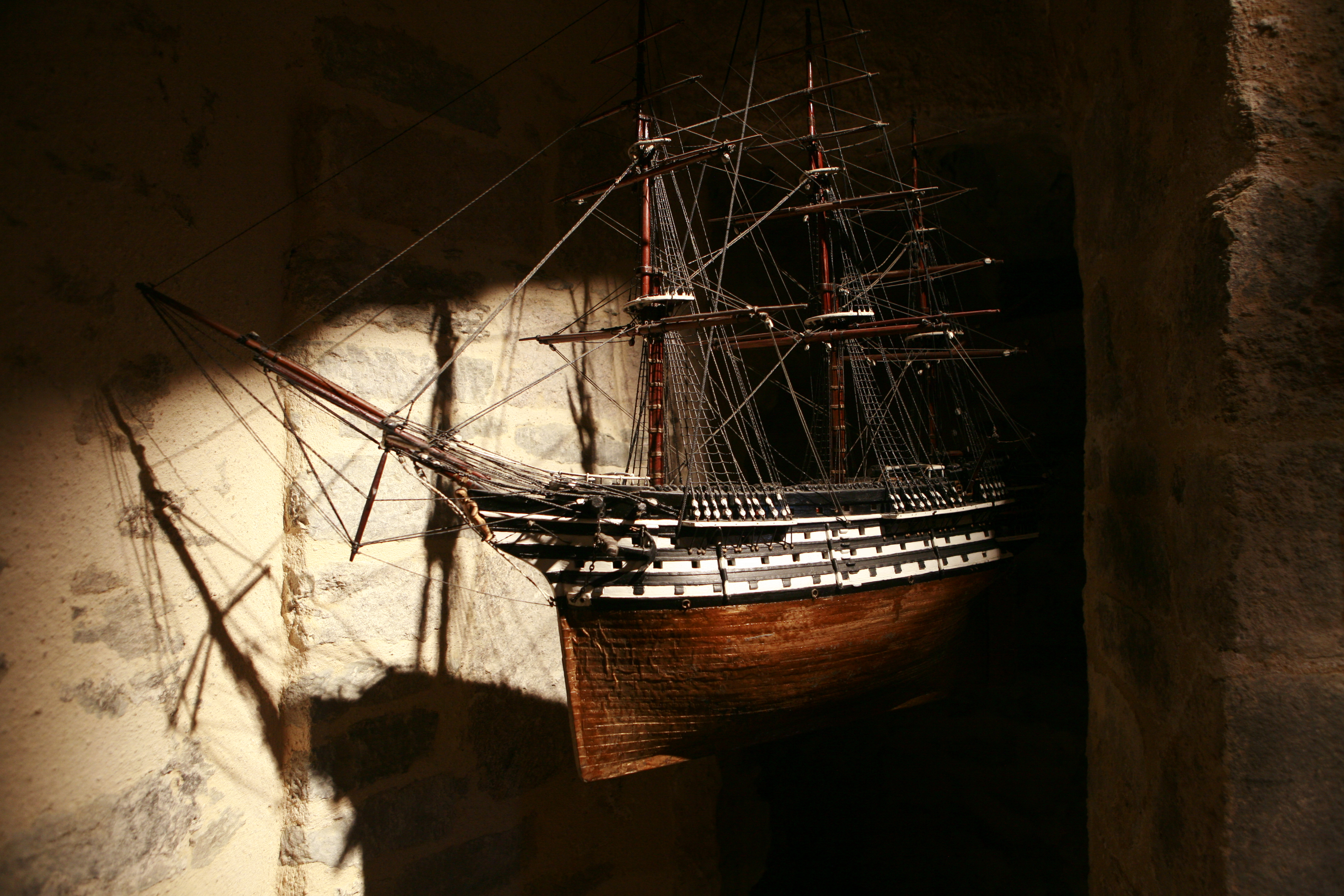
Model of Marengo, on display at Toulon Naval Museum

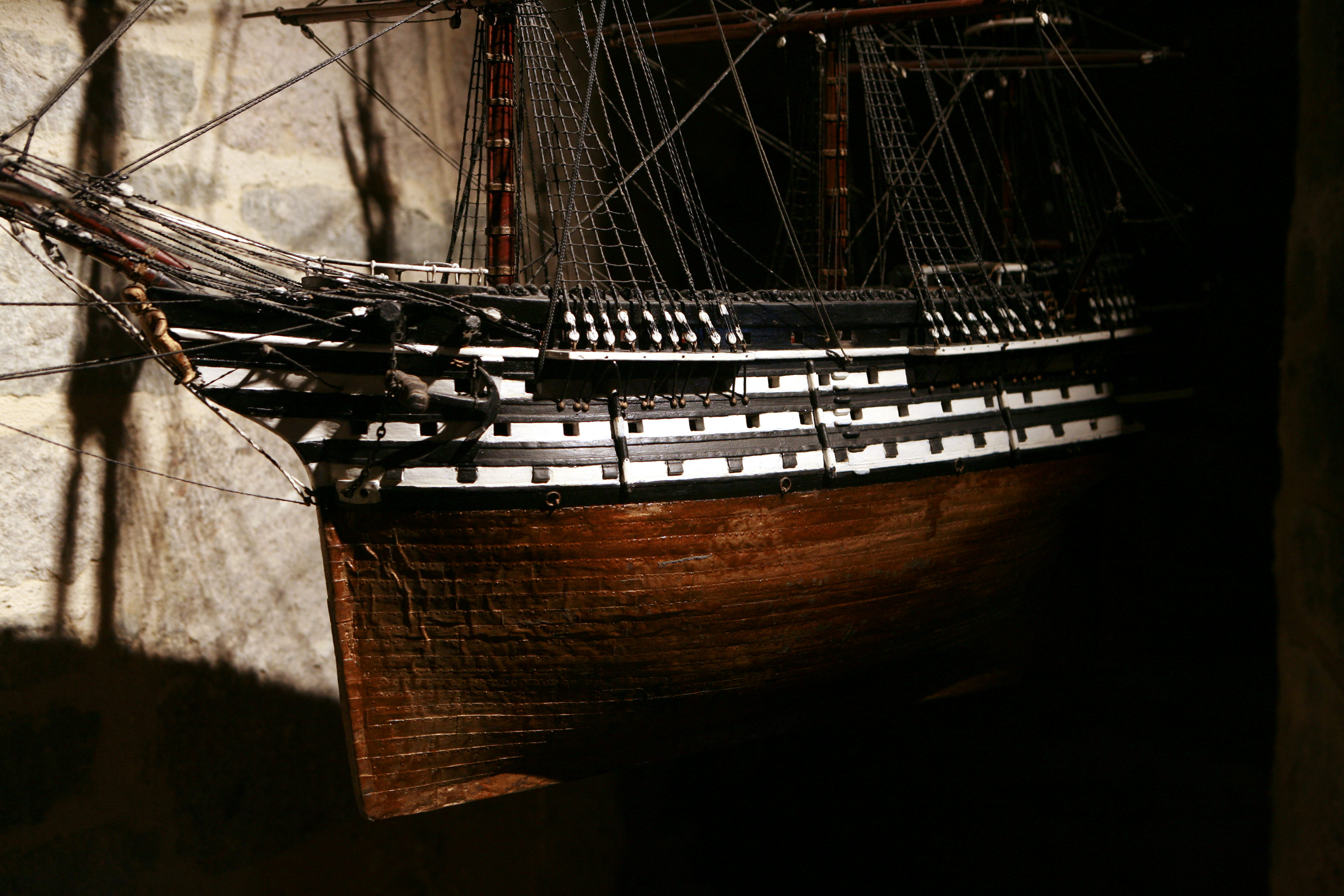
Model of Marengo, on display at Toulon Naval Museum
