= SS Argo =

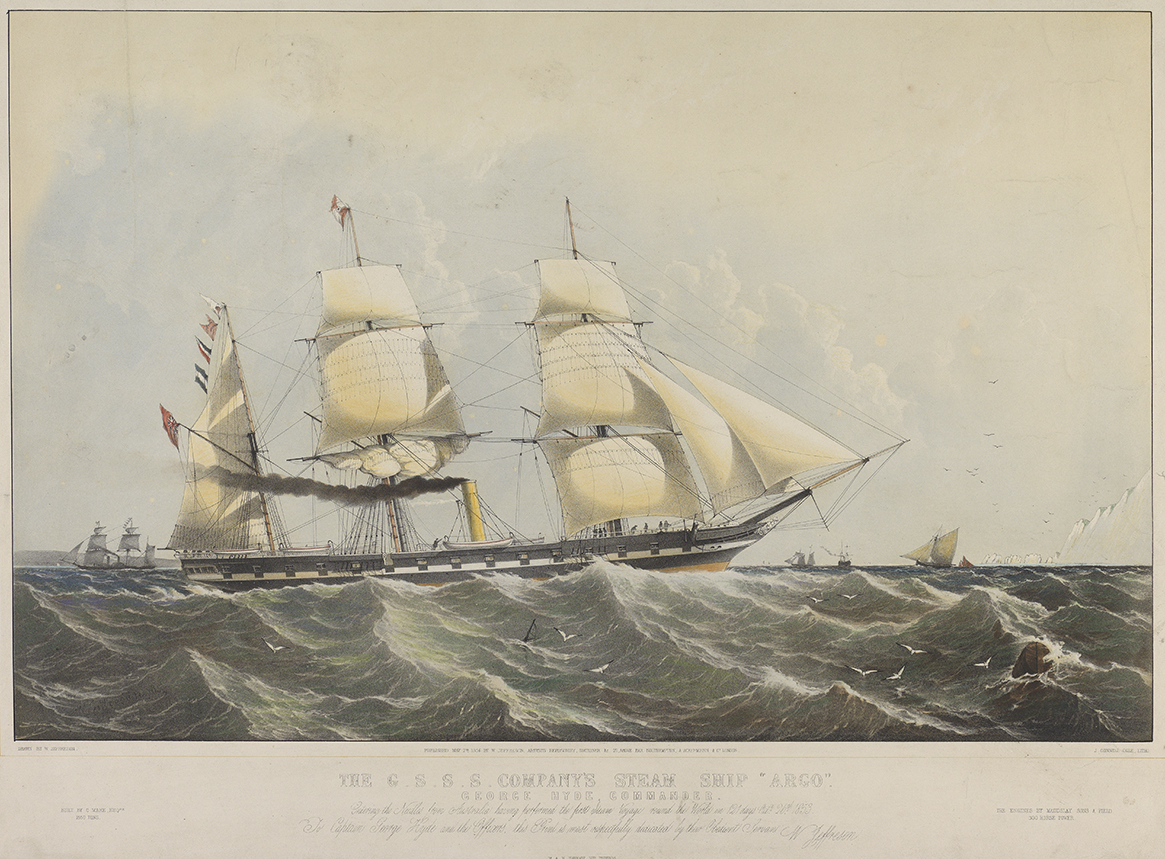
- The G.S.S.S. Company's Steam Ship Argo, entering The Needles from Australia having performed the first steam voyage around the World in 121 days, 26 October 1853

History

United Kingdom
- Builder: C.J. Mare and Company, Leamouth, London
- Fate: Wrecked 28 June 1859, Trepassey Bay, Newfoundland

General characteristics
- Displacement: 1,815 long tons (1,844 t)
- Length: 254 ft (77 m)
- Beam: 39 ft (12 m)
- Propulsion: Sail; Maudslay reciprocating engines, 300 hp (220 kW); Single screw.
- Speed: Average speed 10 knots (19 km/h) (steam or sail)
- Capacity: 210 passengers
- Complement: 120

Argo was an iron screw steamer launched in 1853. She was the first screw steamship to circumnavigate the Earth. (The paddle steamer HMS Driver completed the first steam circumnavigation in 1847.) She was also a Troopship during the tail end of the Crimean War.

== History ==
Argo was built by C.J. Mare and Company of Leamouth, London for the General Screw Steam Shipping Company and launched in 1853. She was a three-masted ship with a clipper bow and a single funnel.

She was an early example of a screw-propelled vessel, though she also possessed a fully functional sail rig, and her screw could be feathered when she was required to travel under sail. This operation could be conducted within 7 minutes from stopping the engines. The screw could also be raised for inspection while at sea if required. During trials she turned out to be a fine sailer, achieving a speed of 10 knots (19 km/h; 12 mph).

On 8 May 1853, Argo sailed under the command of Captain George Hyde from Southampton, reaching Melbourne in 64 days, with one stop en route at Cape St. Vincent. She returned via Cape Horn in 63 days and received considerable acclaim as the first steamer to circumnavigate the globe.

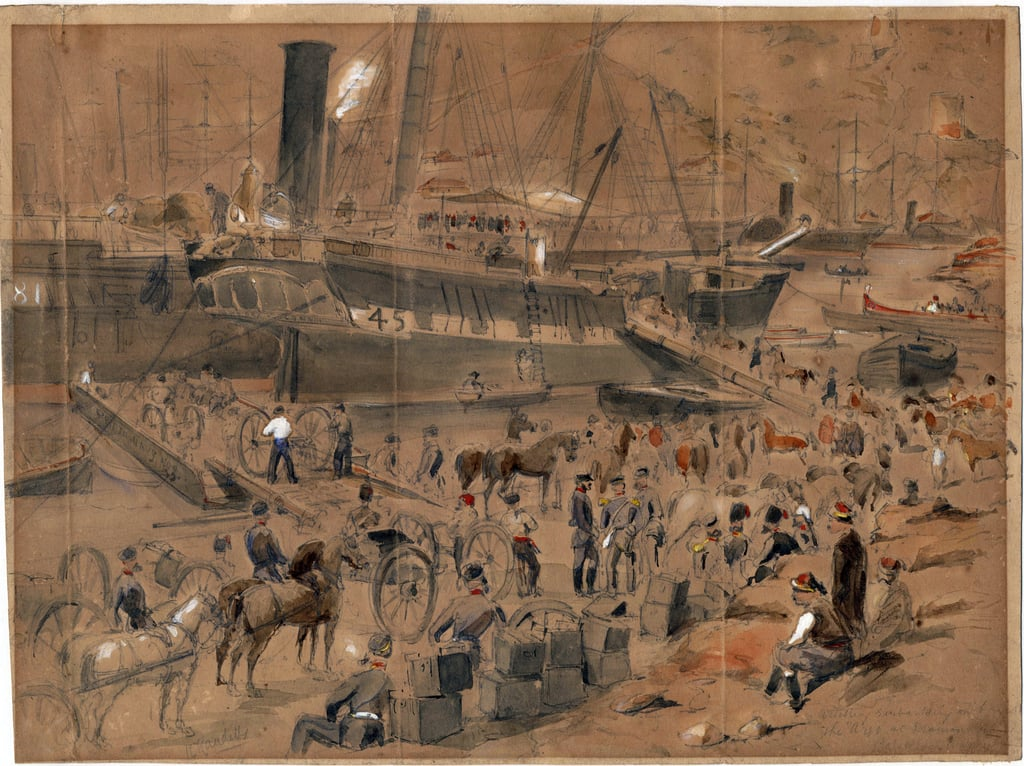
Artillery embarking on board the Argo at Balaclava, May 1856, seen behind the dismasted Medora, as reported by the Illustrated London News correspondent R. T. Landells

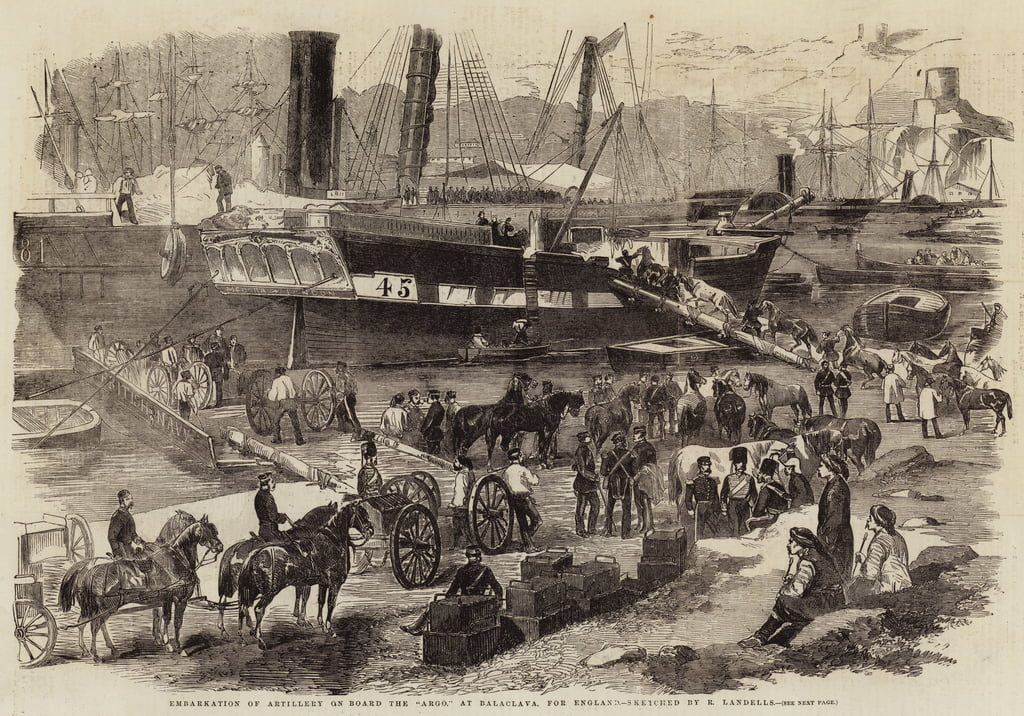
Illustrated London News, 12 July 1856

On her return to England she was engaged by the British Government as a Troopship and horse carrier returning troops from the Crimea in 1855. She made several trips back and forth to Southampton. On 30 May 1856, the French battleship, the Tourville collided into her off the island of Marmora, compelling her to put in for repairs at Constantinople. Queen Victoria greeted her on arrival back at Spithead on 4 August 1856.

Argo was sold along with all the other of the General Screw Company's ships in 1857. She was chartered to the Galway Line in 1859 and was wrecked at Trepassey Bay, Newfoundland, on 28 June 1859 on her first homeward voyage, after running on a reef in thick fog. There was no loss of life.
