= French frigate Diane (1831) =

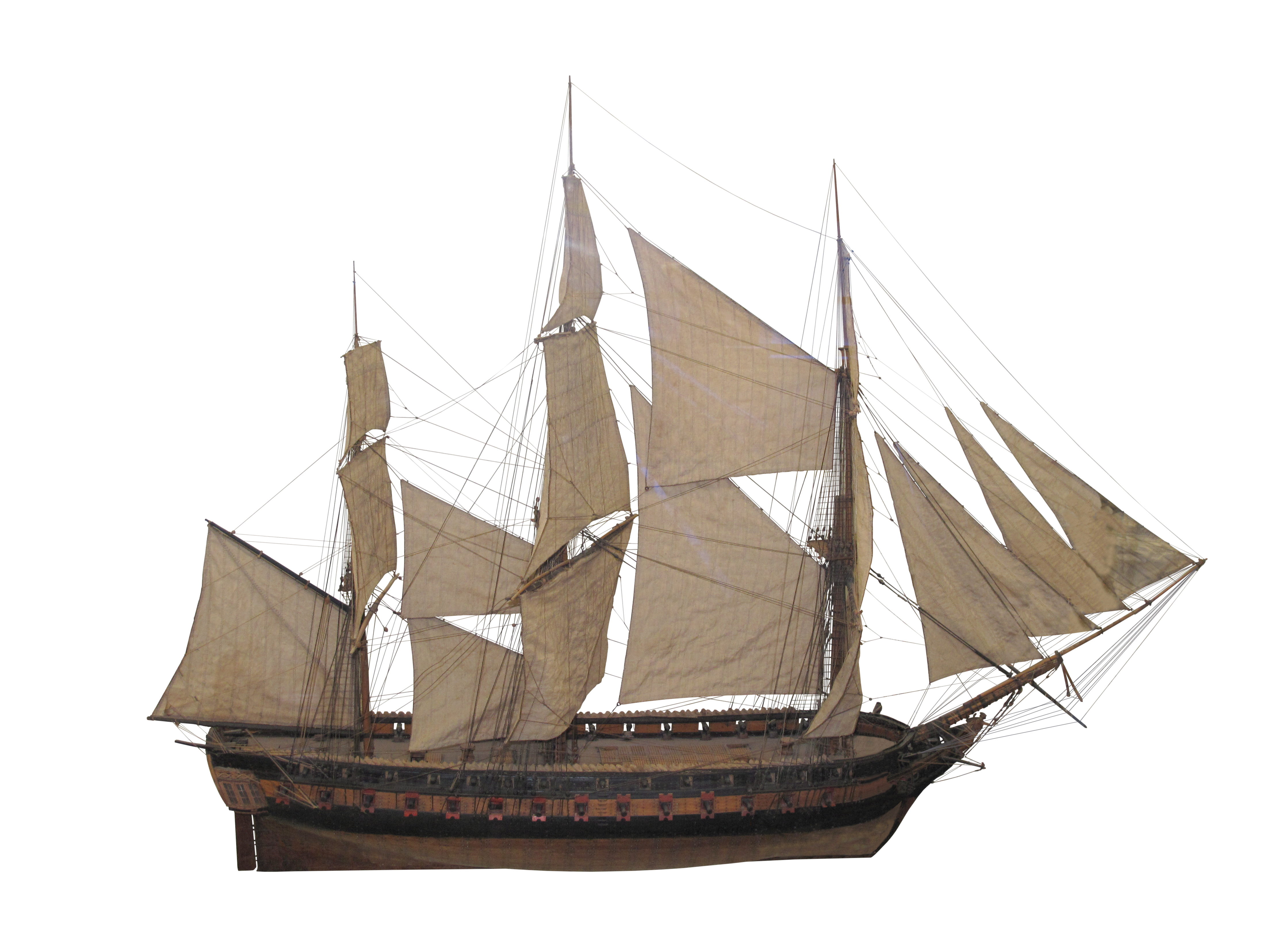
- 1/50th scale model of Diane, on display at the Swiss Museum of Transport.

History

Portugal
- Name: Diana
- Namesake: Diana
- Launched: Circa 1820
- Fate: Captured by the French Navy at the Battle of the Tagus, 11 July 1831

France
- Name: Diane
- Acquired: 11 July 1831

General characteristics
- Class & type: Frigate
- Propulsion: Sail
- Armament: 54 guns
- Armour: timber

Diana was a 54-gun frigate of the Portuguese Navy. She was captured at the Battle of the Tagus and incorporated in the French Navy as Diane.
