= French ship Algésiras (1823) =

Ship of the line of the French Navy

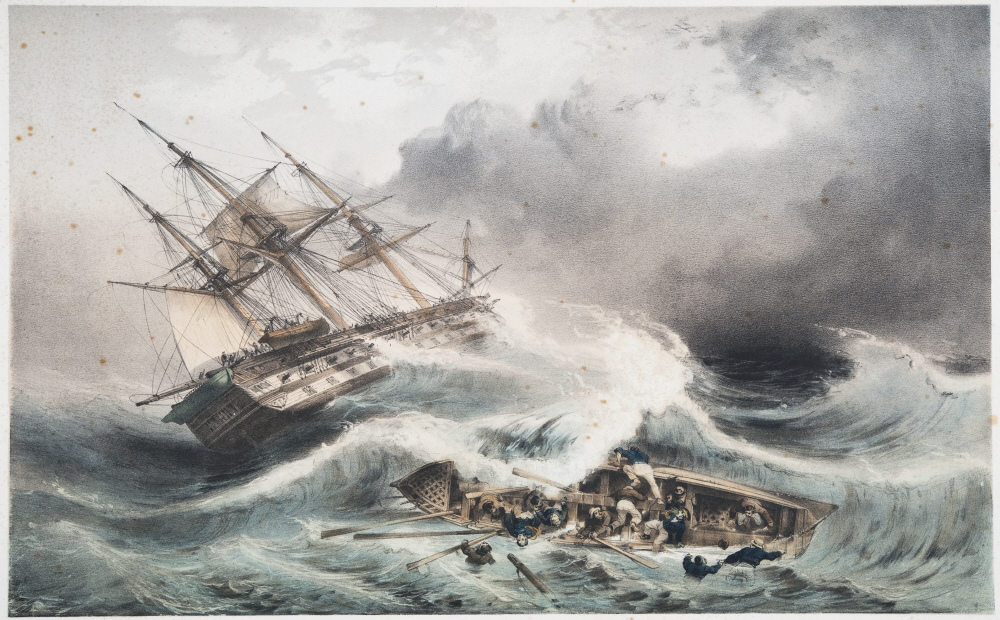
- Loss of a longboat of Algésiras in a storm, 9 August 1831.

History

France
- Name: Algésiras
- Namesake: Battle of Algeciras
- Ordered: 20 February 1812
- Builder: Lorient
- Laid down: 1 April 1812
- Launched: 21 August 1823
- In service: 20 August 1828
- Stricken: 1846
- Fate: Hulked 1846

General characteristics
- Class & type: Bucentaure-class ship of the line
- Displacement: 3,868 tonneaux
- Tons burthen: 2,034 port tonneaux
- Length: 59.28 m (194 ft 6 in)
- Beam: 15.27 m (50 ft 1 in)
- Draught: 7.8 m (25 ft 7 in)
- Depth of hold: 7.64 m (25 ft 1 in)
- Sail plan: Full-rigged ship
- Crew: 866 (wartime)
- Armament: 90 guns: Lower gun deck: 30 × 36 pdr guns; Upper gun deck: 32 × 24 pdr guns; Forecastle and Quarterdeck: 14 × 12 pdr guns & 14 × 36 pdr carronades

The Algésiras was a 3rd rank, 90-gun Bucentaure-class ship of the line built for the French Navy during the first decade of the 19th century. Completed in 1824, she played a minor role in the French Invasion of Algiers in 1830.

== Description ==
Designed by Jacques-Noël Sané, the Bucentaure-class ships had a length of 59.28 metres (194 ft 6 in), a beam of 15.27 metres (50 ft 1 in) and a depth of hold of 7.64 metres (25 ft 1 in). The ships displaced 3,868 tonneaux and had a mean draught of 7.8 metres (25 ft 7 in). They had a tonnage of 2,034 port tonneaux. Their crew numbered 866 officers and ratings during wartime. They were fitted with three masts and ship rigged.

The muzzle-loading, smoothbore armament of the Bucentaure class consisted of thirty 36-pounder long guns on the lower gun deck and thirty-two 24-pounder long guns on the upper gun deck. The armament on the quarterdeck and forecastle varied as the ships' authorised armament was changed over the years that the Bucentares were built. Algésiras was fitted with fourteen 12-pounder long guns and fourteen 36-pounder carronades.

== Construction and career ==
Algésiras was ordered on 20 February 1812 and laid down on 1 April at the Arsenal de Lorient. The ship was launched on 21 August 1823 and completed in April 1824. She was commissioned on 20 August 1828. Algésiras participated in the Invasion of Algiers in 1830, under Captain Ponée, and in the Battle of the Tagus the next year, under Captain Moulac. In 1832, she was used as a troopship to ferry troops to Algeria. In 1836, the ship cruised the Caribbean with the frigate Artémise. Algésiras was struck in 1846 and used as a prison hulk.

The ship was mentioned in Les Misérables, where she is mislabeled as a frigate:

The frigate Algesiras was anchored alongside the Orion, and the poor convict had fallen between the two vessels
Book Two, chapter III
