= French ship Tourville (1853) =

Ship of the line of the French Navy

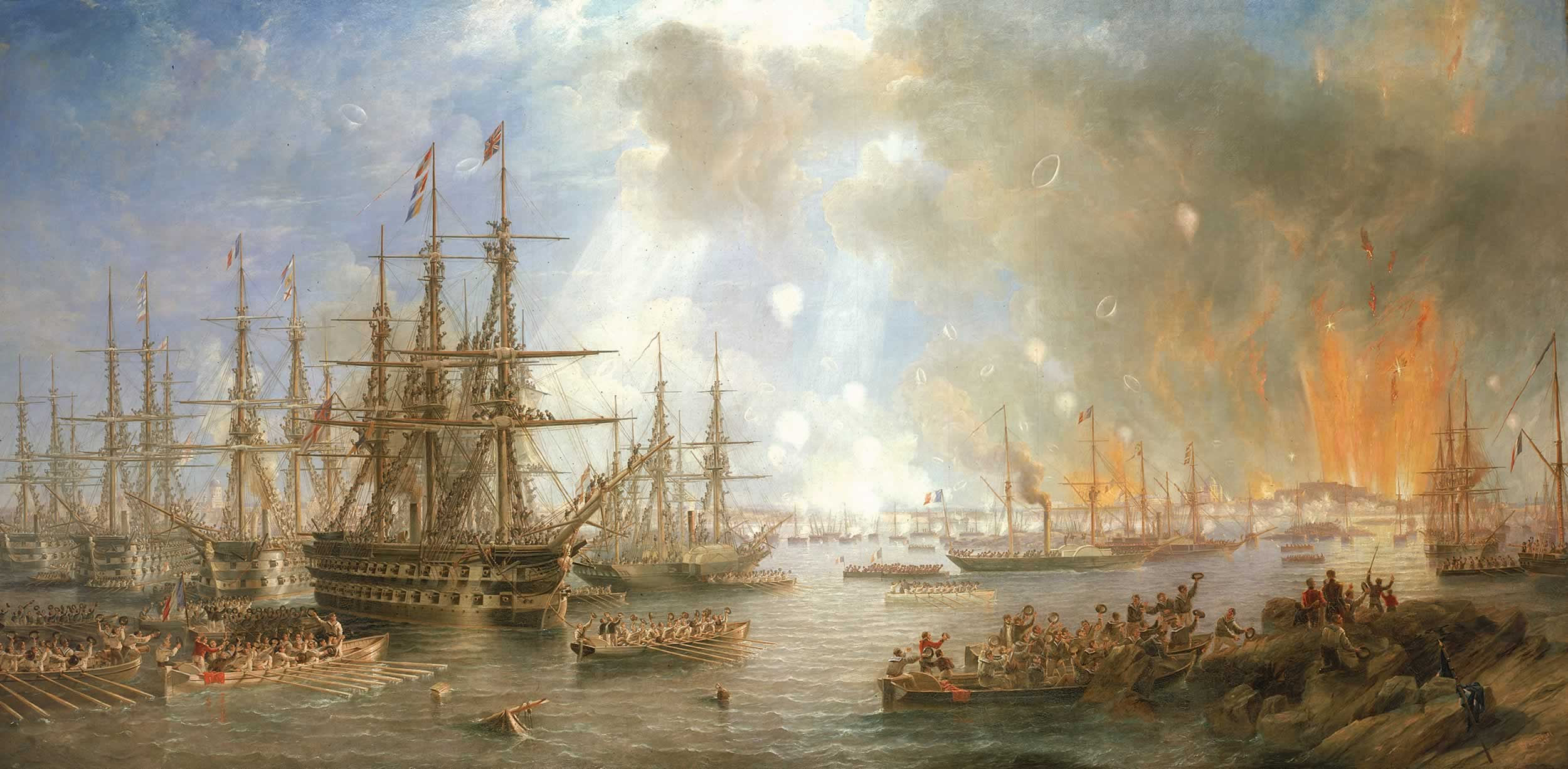
- Tourville (third from the left) at the Bombardment of Sveaborg, 9 August 1855 by John Wilson Carmichael

History

France
- Name: Tourville
- Namesake: Anne Hilarion de Tourville
- Builder: Brest
- Laid down: 26 August 1847
- Launched: 31 October 1853
- Out of service: 12 August 1872
- Fate: Scrapped 1878

General characteristics
- Class & type: Tourville-class ship of the line
- Tons burthen: 4,400 tonnes
- Length: 61.40 m (201.4 ft)
- Beam: 16.69 m (54.8 ft)
- Draught: 7.23 m (23.7 ft)
- Propulsion: Sail; Steam engine, 650 hp (485 kW)
- Armament: 90 guns
- Armour: Timber

Tourville was a 90-gun sail and steam ship of the line of the French Navy, lead ship of her class.

== Career ==
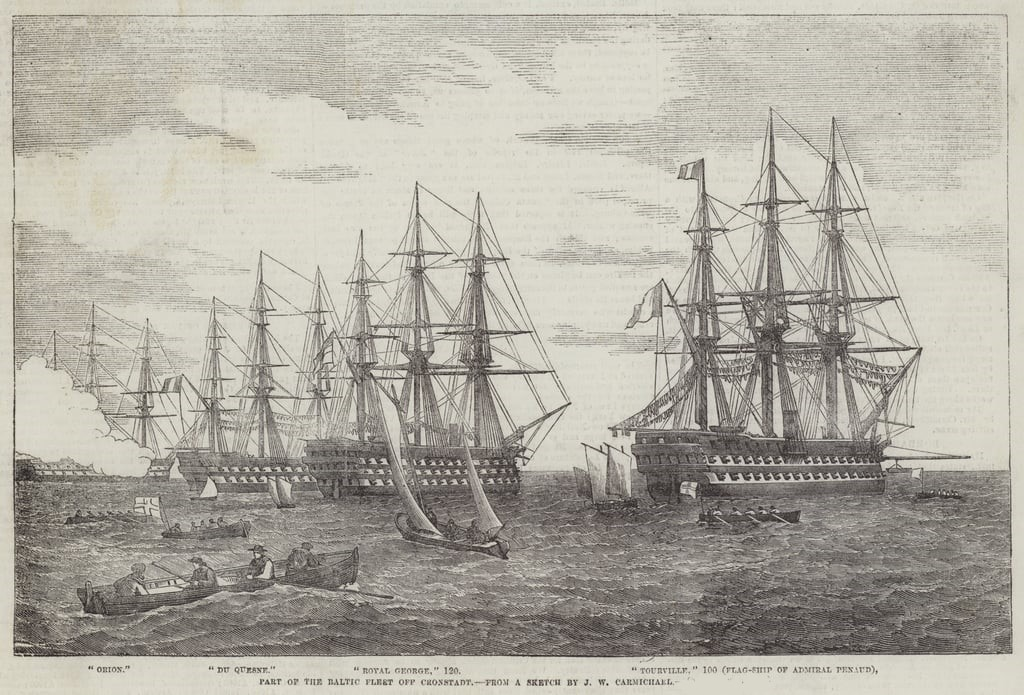
Part of the Baltic Fleet off Cronstadt, ships L-R; Orion; Du Quesne; Royal George; and Tourville, Flag Ship of Admiral Pénaud. Illustrated London News 1855

She took part in the Baltic theatre of the Crimean War, shelling Sveaborg on 10 August 1855. She later took part in the French Intervention in Mexico as a troop ship.

Put in ordinary in 1864. On the 30 May 1856 off the island of Marmora she collided with a British Government Troopship and horse carrier, the Argo returning troops from the Crimea, compelling the Argo to put in for repairs at Constantinople.

She was hulked in Cherbourg in 1871 to serve as a prison for survivors of the Paris Commune. Struck the next year, she was renamed to Nestor and eventually broken up in 1878.
