= French ship Colosse (1813) =

Ship of the line of the French Navy

History

France
- Name: Colosse
- Namesake: "Colossus"; Pallas Athena
- Ordered: 20 February 1812
- Builder: Toulon
- Launched: 5 December 1813
- Renamed: Pallas in 1821
- Fate: Broken up in 1840

General characteristics
- Class & type: Téméraire-class ship of the line
- Displacement: 3,069 tonneaux
- Tons burthen: 1,537 port tonneaux
- Length: 55.87 m (183 ft 4 in)
- Beam: 14.46 m (47 ft 5 in)
- Draught: 7.15 m (23.5 ft)
- Depth of hold: 7.15 m (23 ft 5 in)
- Sail plan: Full-rigged ship
- Crew: 705
- Armament: 74 guns: Lower gun deck: 28 × 36 pdr guns; Upper gun deck: 30 × 18 pdr guns; Forecastle and Quarterdeck: 16–28 × 8 pdr guns and 36 pdr carronades

Colosse was a 74-gun Téméraire-class ship of the line built for the French Navy during the 1810s. Completed in 1819, she played a minor role in the Invasion of Algiers in 1830. The ship was razeed during 1825–1827 and converted into a 1st-rank frigate named Pallas.

== Description ==
Designed by Jacques-Noël Sané, the Téméraire-class ships had a length of 55.87 metres (183 ft 4 in), a beam of 14.46 metres (47 ft 5 in) and a depth of hold of 7.15 metres (23 ft 5 in). The ships displaced 3,069 tonneaux and had a mean draught of 7.15 metres (23 ft 5 in). They had a tonnage of 1,537 port tonneaux. Their crew numbered 705 officers and ratings during wartime. They were fitted with three masts and ship rigged.

The muzzle-loading, smoothbore armament of the Téméraire class consisted of twenty-eight 36-pounder long guns on the lower gun deck and thirty 18-pounder long guns on the upper gun deck. After about 1807, the armament on the quarterdeck and forecastle varied widely between ships with differing numbers of 8-pounder long guns and 36-pounder carronades. The total number of guns varied between sixteen and twenty-eight. The 36-pounder obusiers formerly mounted on the poop deck (dunette) in older ships were removed as obsolete.

== Construction and career ==
Colosse was ordered on 20 February 1812 and was laid down in July 1812 at the Arsenal de Toulon. The ship was named on 31 August and launched on 5 December 1813, amidst a ceremony honouring the anniversary of the Battle of Austerlitz. She was completed in January 1814 and was commissioned on 1 June 1819 by Captain Louvel. In 1821, she cruised in the Caribbean under Captain Ducampe de Rosamel. During the events of the "Hundred Thousand Sons of Saint Louis", she took part in the bombardment of Cadiz under Captain de la Bretonnière.

Between 1825 and 1827, her forecastle and quarterdeck were removed and she was turned into the flush deck, 60-gun first-rank frigate Pallas. As Pallas, she took part in the Invasion of Algiers in 1830, and in the Battle of the Tagus, under Captain Buchet de Châteauville. Upon her return, she was decommissioned, and condemned in 1840.
