= French frigate Artémise (1828) =

French Navy 60-gun frigate

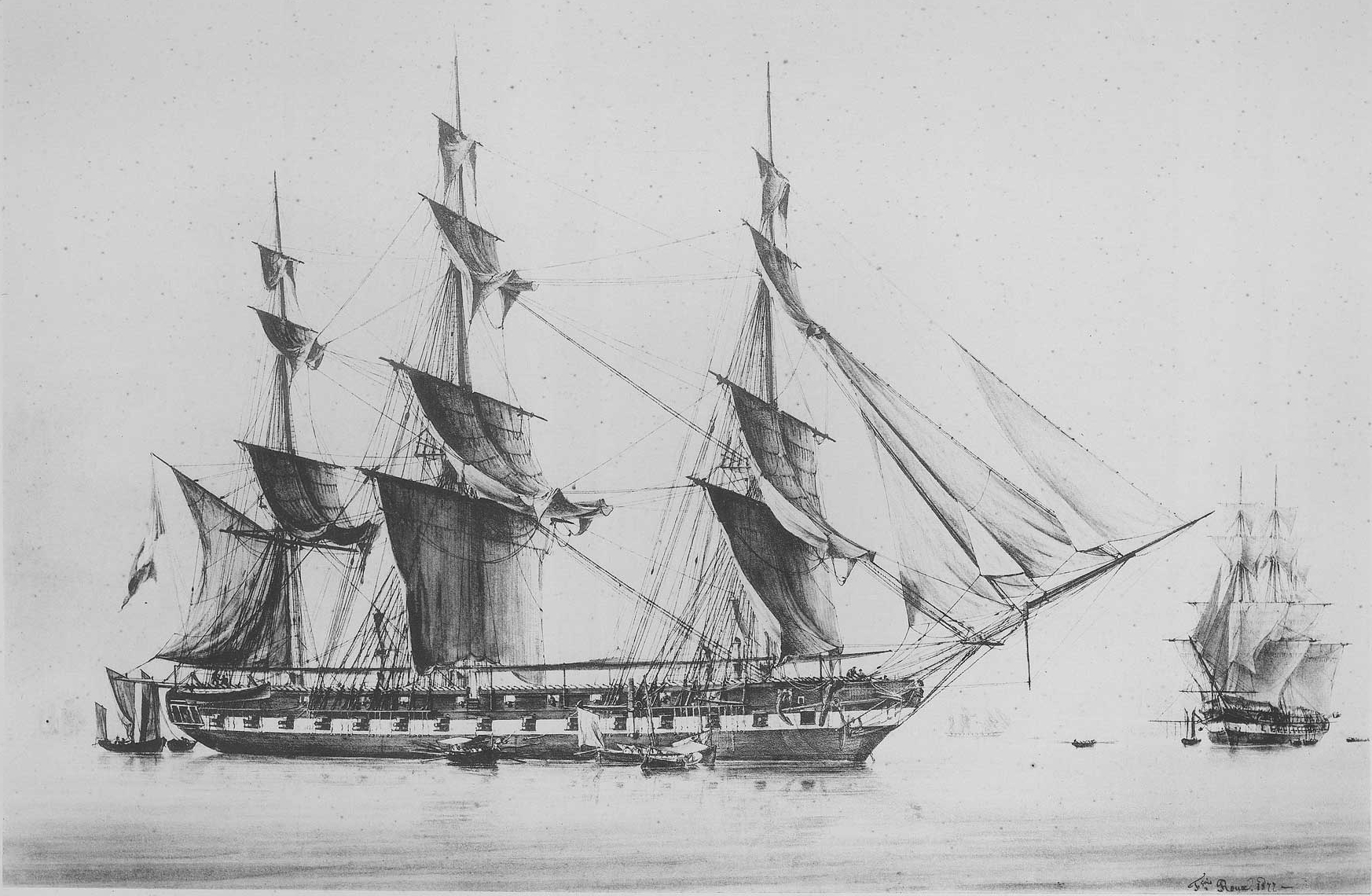
- Portrait of Artémise by François Roux

History

France
- Name: Artémise
- Namesake: Artemisia I of Caria / Artemis
- Builder: Lorient
- Laid down: 1826
- Launched: 22 November 1828
- In service: 22 January 1829
- Fate: Hulked in Lorient

General characteristics
- Complement: 265–285
- Armament: 60 guns

The Artémise was a 60-gun frigate of the French Navy, designed by Jean-Baptiste Hubert.

== Career ==
Built as a 60-gun frigate carrying a main 24-pounder battery, Artémise was armed en flûte in 1830 for the Expédition d'Alger and used as a troop ship. In 1832, she took part in the Battle of Ancona, ferrying troops along with Suffren and Victoire. She served as a transport in the Mediterranean and to Alger in the years following.

In 1836, under Captain Laplace, Artémise took part in an expedition to the Caribbean, along with Algésiras, and the next year circumnavigated the globe. On 22 April 1839, she ran aground at Tahiti and was damaged. She was refloated with assistance from the American ship Champion. Repairs were estimated to need six months to complete.

In July 1839, she took part in the Laplace affair in Honolulu, in which King Kamehameha III was forced to grant religious toleration to Catholics in his dominions.

Returned to Lorient in April 1840, she was struck, renamed Arc-en-Ciel and used as a hulk.

Diorama of Artémise carreening, on display at the Musée national de la Marine
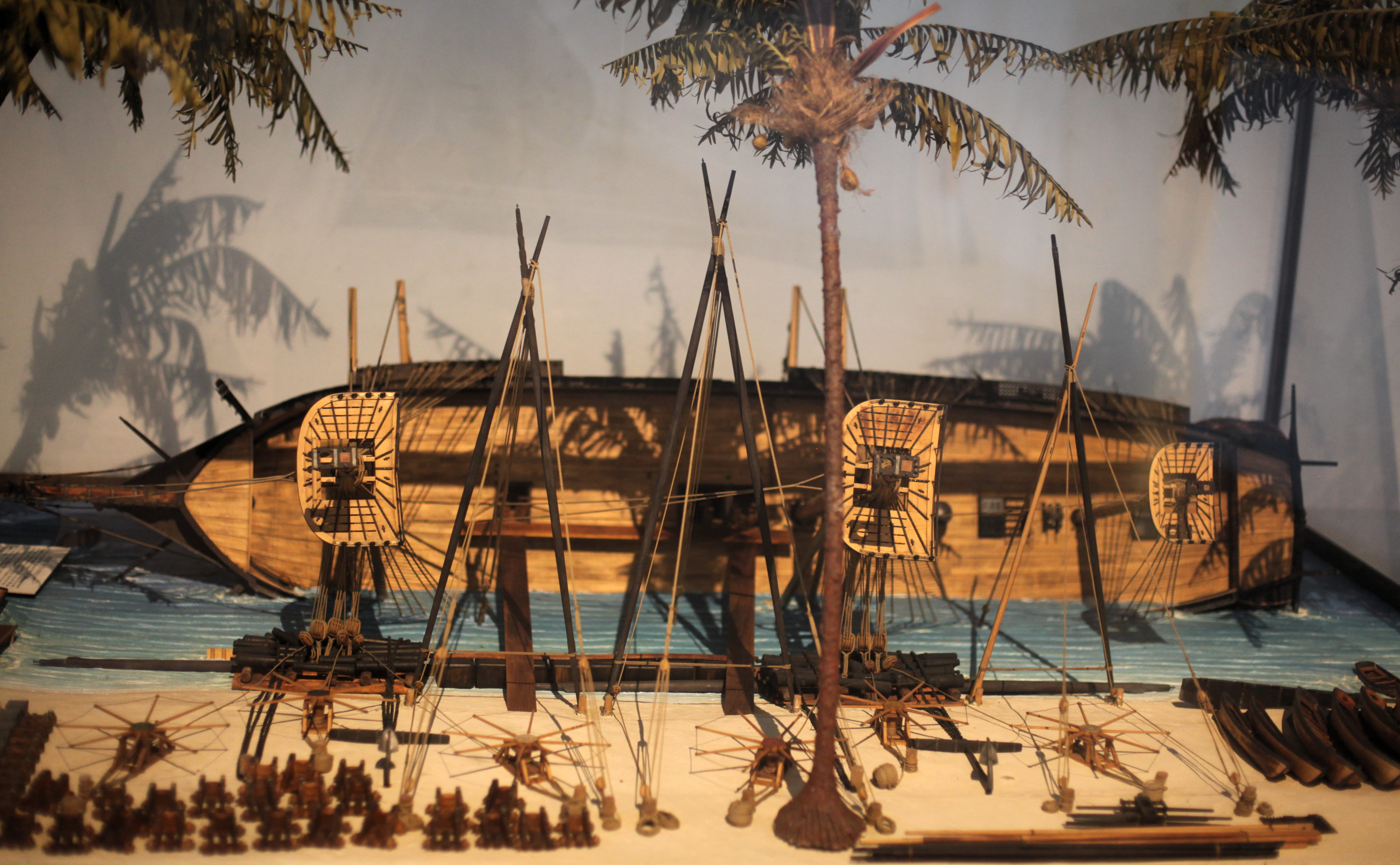

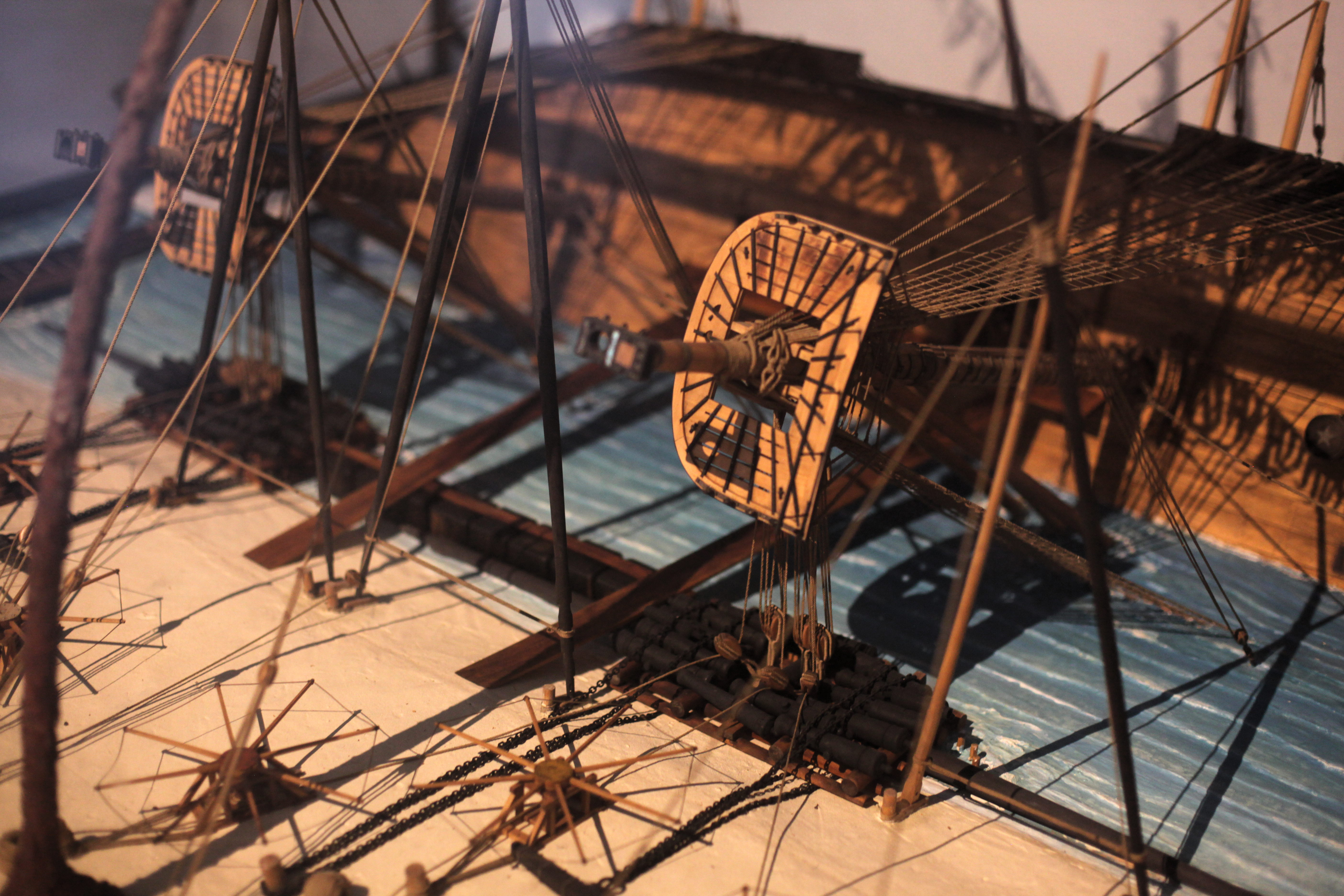

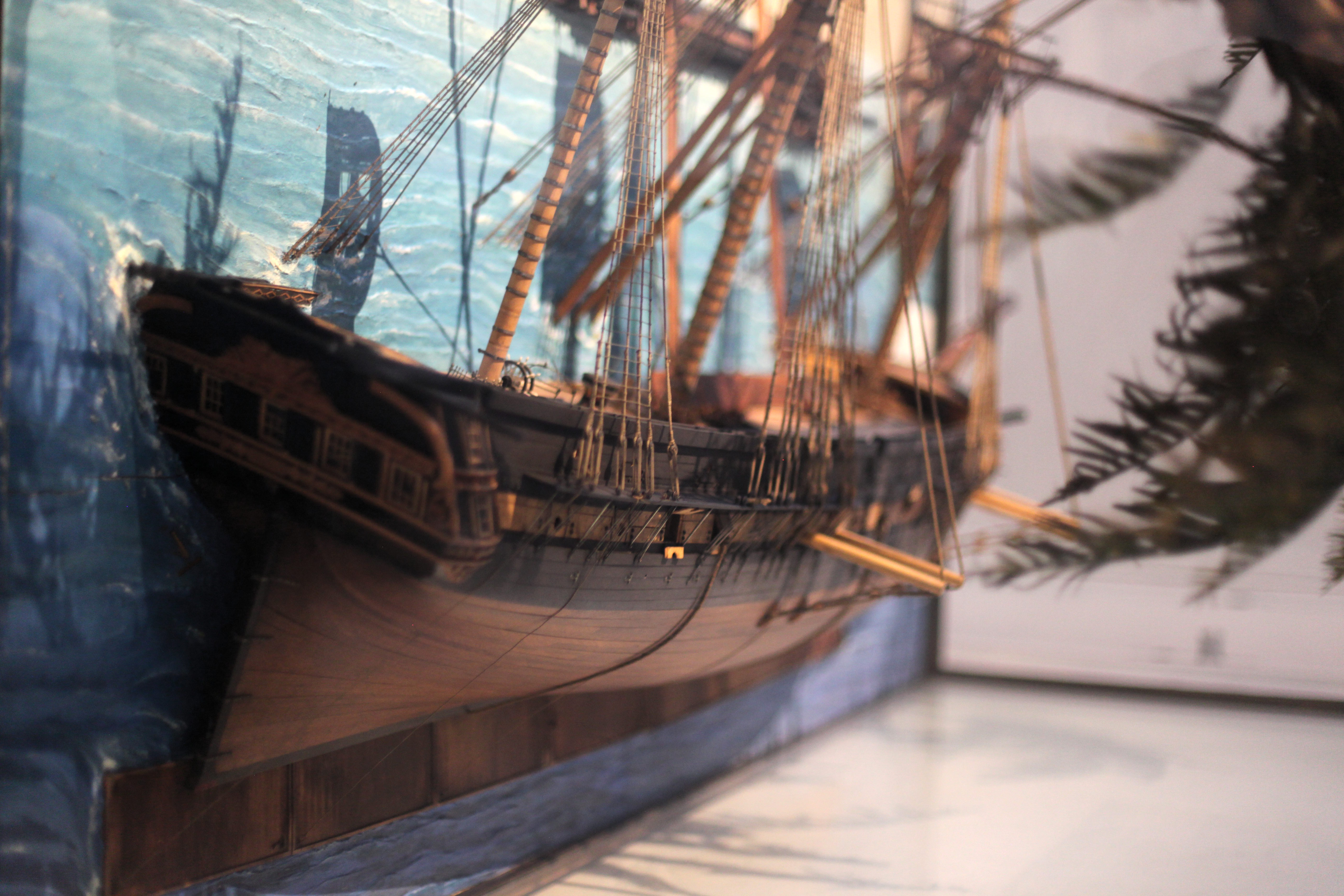
