= Bombardment of Sveaborg =

1855 battle of the Crimean War

Coordinates: 60°8′53″N 24°59′11″E

- Part of the Åland War and the Crimean War
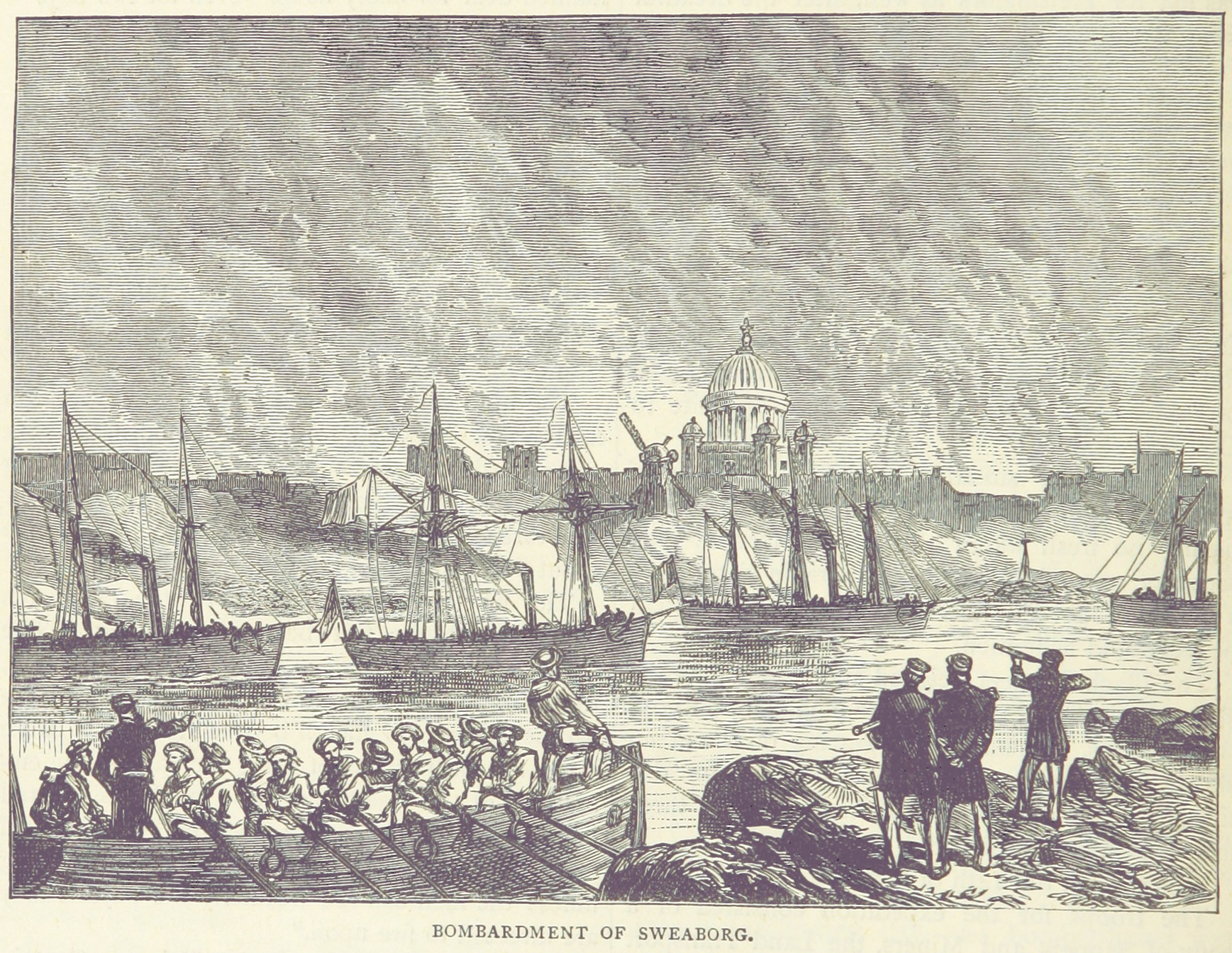
- A British illustration of the attack
Date	9–11 August 1855
Location	Sveaborg (Suomenlinna), Grand Duchy of Finland
Result	Inconclusive

Belligerents
(Russia) Russian Empire: (Russia) Grand Duchy of Finland	(France) French Empire; United Kingdom

Commanders and leaders
Aleksei Sorokin	Richard Dundas (France) Charles Pénaud

Strength
15,000 soldiers 1,500 cannons	80 ships

Casualties and losses
260 killed or wounded	1 killed 15 wounded

The Bombardment of Sveaborg, also known as the Battle of Sveaborg, took place on 9–11 August 1855, between Russian defenders and a joint British–French fleet during the Åland War, a Baltic Sea theater of the Crimean War. British and French ships bombarded the Russian fortress of Sveaborg from beyond the range of the defenders' artillery. After 48 hours of bombardment, the attackers withdrew without attempting a landing.

== Background ==
Constructed during the Swedish rule of Finland in the 18th century, the Fortress of Sveaborg (known as Viapori in Finnish, and renamed Suomenlinna in 1918) was the main defensive installation in the Grand Duchy of Finland. After the capital of the Grand Duchy of Finland was moved from Turku to Helsinki in 1812 the value of Sveaborg only increased. However, by the Crimean War the artillery of the fortress had already become obsolete. After the engagements of 1854 Russians (and Finns) expected an attack on Sveaborg in 1855. The small skirmishes that had been fought along the coast between Russian and British-French forces in the early summer of 1855 only worsened the fear while bulk of the Russian fleet had become isolated and surrounded in the port and fortress of Kronstadt off Saint Petersburg.

== Battle ==
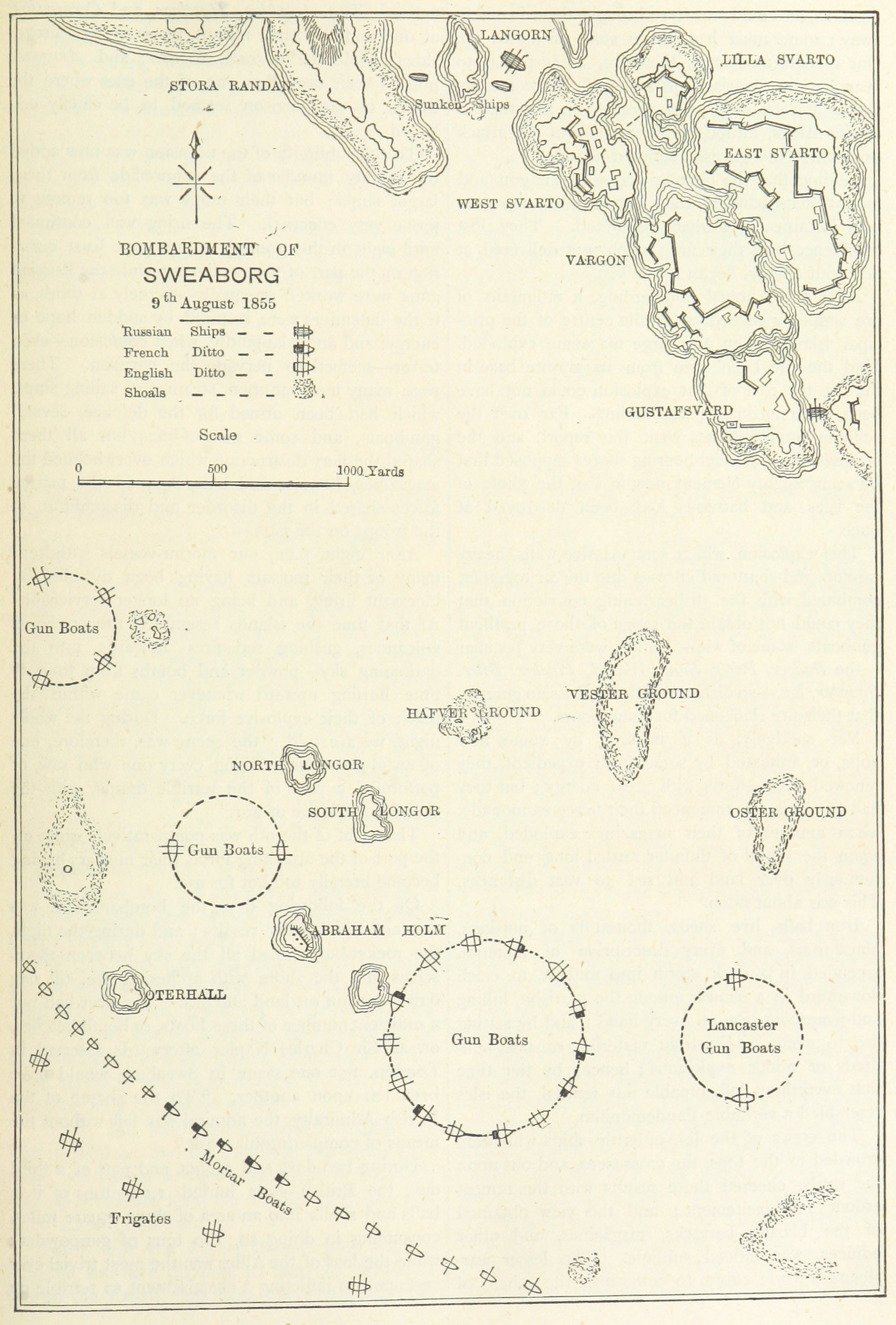
A map of the positions of the attacking ships

British and French naval forces consisting of 77 ships arrayed for the long-expected battle on 6 August 1855. They formed into a battle line more than 3 km off shore beyond the range of the defenders' obsolete artillery. Three days later the bombardment commenced. It continued for 47–48 hours, with 18,500 rounds fired. All the while, the attacker sat beyond the range of the defenders' guns. The British and French bombarded only the Fortress of Sveaborg and avoided firing at the town of Helsinki directly. While the bombardment caused damage to the structures above ground, including to several gunpowder magazines which exploded, the bulk of the defending forces survived unscathed with their weaponry intact, leading to a stalemate with the attackers guns being unable to defeat the defender and defenders guns being unable to reach the attacker. Once the guns had become silenced, the ships remained in the same offshore position, leading to growing fears of a landing. However British and French forces landed troops neither at Sveaborg nor Helsinki, and eventually withdrew.
