= French ship Ville de Paris (1850) =

Ship of the line of the French Navy

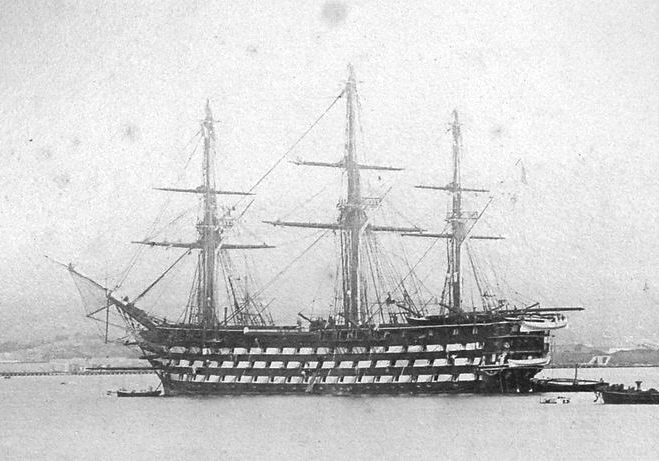
- Ville de Paris circa 1854

History

France
- Builder: Rochefort shipyard
- Laid down: 13 June 1807
- Launched: 5 October 1850
- Commissioned: 25 July 1851
- Reclassified: May 1858
- Stricken: 7 February 1882
- Reinstated: 1 October 1858
- Fate: Broken up 2 March 1898

General characteristics
- Class & type: Océan-class ship of the line
- Displacement: 5,302 tonnes
- Length: 65.18 m (213.8 ft) (196.6 French feet)
- Beam: 16.24 m (53.3 ft) (50 French feet)
- Draught: 8.12 m (26.6 ft) (25 French feet)
- Propulsion: sail, 3,265 m^{2} (35,140 sq ft); one-shaft steam engine, 1,581 shp (1,179 kW)
- Speed: 10.6 knots (19.6 km/h; 12.2 mph)
- Complement: 1,079
- Armament: Rated as 120-gun: lower deck: 32 36-pounder guns; middle deck: 34 24-pounder guns; upper deck: 34 18-pounder guns; forecastle: 18 8-pounder guns, 6 36-pounder carronades

Ville de Paris was an Océan-class 118-gun ship of the line of the French Navy.

== Service history ==
Her keel was laid down at Rochefort in 1807 as Marengo. During her construction, she was renamed Ville de Vienne, Comte d'Artois during the Bourbon Restoration, Ville de Vienne again briefly during the Hundred Days and back to Comte d'Artois thereafter. On 9 October 1830, following the July Revolution, she took her name of Ville de Paris. She was launched on 5 October 1850.

In 1851, she sailed to Toulon where she served as flagship of the squadron, under captain Charles Pénaud.

=== Crimean War ===
On 23 March 1853, she departed Toulon for Greece, leading the First Squadron of Vice-Admiral Régnault de La Susse. She arrived at Athens in March 1853, where La Susse was relieved, and joined with the British squadron under Admiral Dundas at Malta. In June 1853, the allied fleet arrived at Beşik Bay. On 15 July 1853, Admiral Hamelin took over command of the French squadron. On 22 September 1853, the fleet departed for the Dardanelles, Ville de Paris in tow of Napoléon. During the operations in the Sea of Marmara, she was towed by other steamships.

In 1854, the squadron blockaded the Black Sea and protected the allied lines of supply. Ville de Paris arrived at Odessa on 6 January 1854, taking Russian prisoners captured by other French units, and directing the shelling of the city on 22 March 1854. In late July 1854, a cholera epidemic broke out in the fleet. On 11 August 1854, the fleet sailed in quarantine. By the end of the month, Ville de Paris had 140 dead. On 2 September 1854, Saint Arnaud, general Canrobert and their staff came aboard to direct the landing at Eupatoria. Ville de Paris was again taken in tow of Napoléon and the fleet moved to Eupatoria, joining with the British fleet on 13 September. The next day at 8:30 am, the army landed. Eventually, 60,000 soldiers were landed by 16 September.

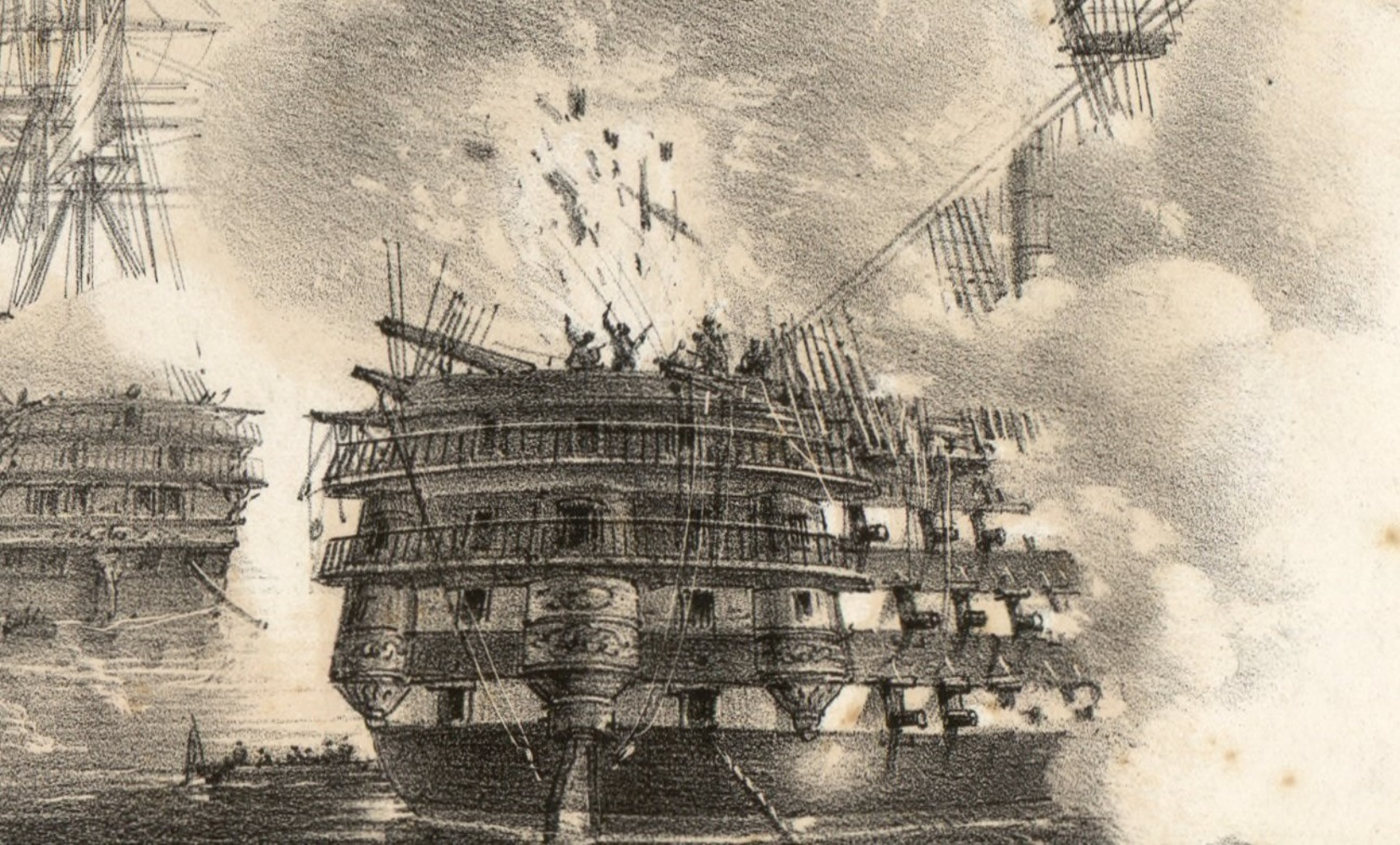
The explosion of a Russian shell on Ville de Paris at Sebastopol in 1854

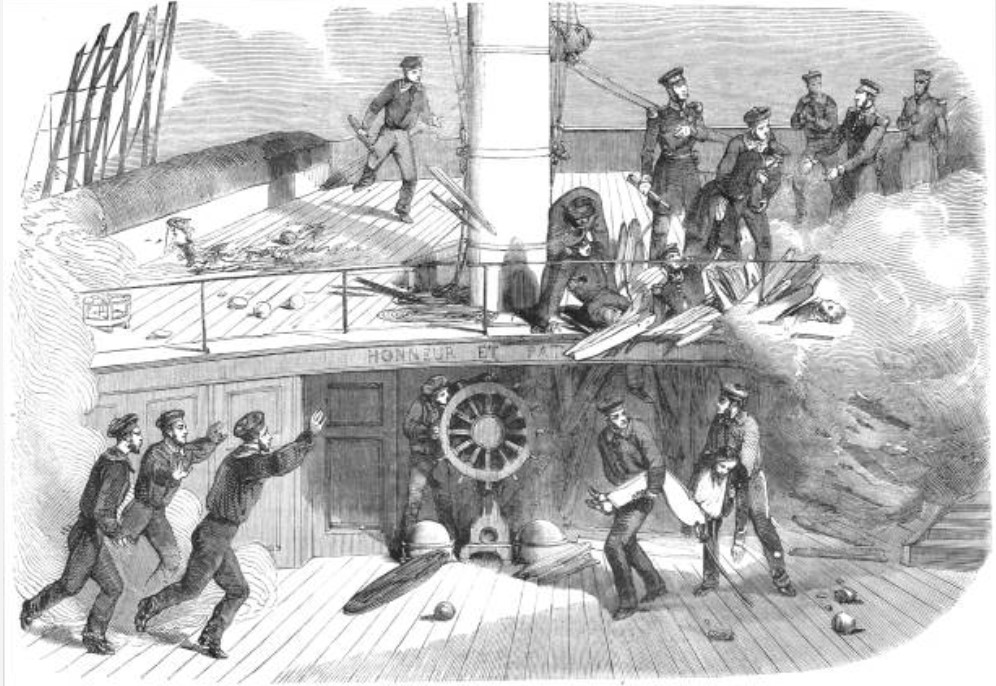
The deck of the Ville De Paris, at the moment when the poop was struck by the Russian shell at Sebastopol

On 17 October 1854, Ville de Paris launched the bombardment of Sevastopol by signaling "France watches you". Her poop deck was soon struck by a shell and two round shots, killing two and wounding six men. By 7:00 PM, Ville de Paris had received 50 shots in her hull and one hundred in her rigging. On 14 November 1854, Ville de Paris lost steering during a storm, and had to return to the Bosporus in tow of a steamship. She was repaired at Constantinople, returning to sea on 21 December 1854. She returned to Toulon on 28 March 1855.

=== Conversion and fate ===
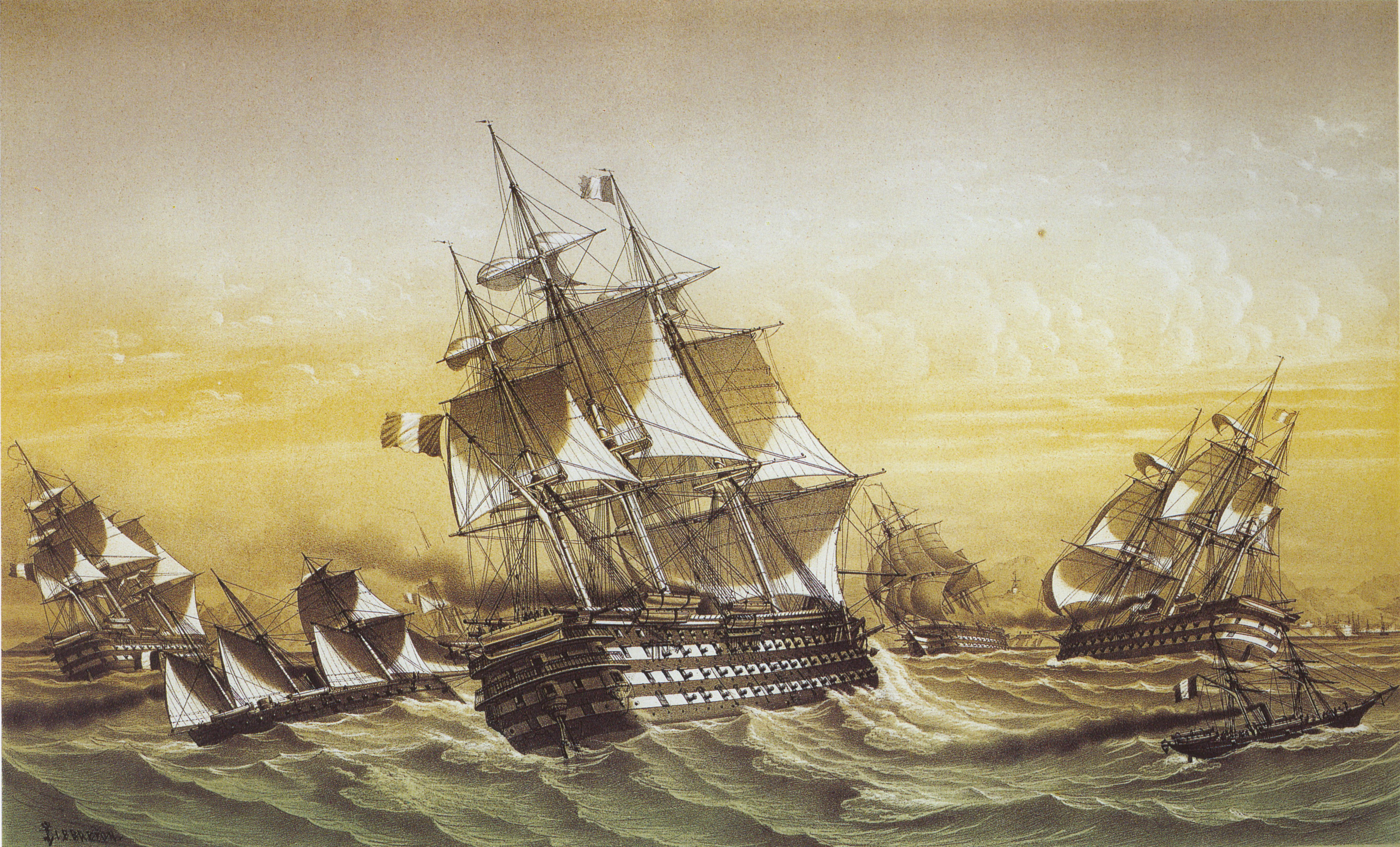
Ville de Paris among the escadre d'évolution, around 1864

From July 1857, Ville de Paris was transformed into a steamship, gaining 5.47 metres (17.9 ft) in the process. She was launched in May 1858 and recommissioned in August 1858. In 1870, she was converted into a troopship, her engine removed, and in 1881 she was used as a hulk. Ville de Paris was sold for scrapping on 2 March 1898.
