= French ship Provence (1815) =

Ship of the line of the French Navy

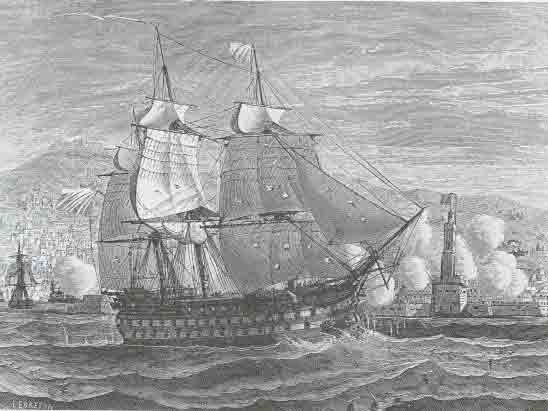
- Provence during the invasion of Algiers in 1830, by Lebreton

History

France
- Name: Provence
- Namesake: Provence
- Builder: Toulon
- Laid down: 5 November 1812, as Kremlin
- Launched: 26 May 1815 as Hercule
- Commissioned: August 1827
- Renamed: Provence, 9 April 1814; Hercule, 23 March 1815; Provence, 15 July 1815; Alger, 15 July 1830
- Stricken: 31 December 1855
- Fate: Broken up, 1881

General characteristics
- Class & type: Téméraire-class ship of the line
- Displacement: 3,069 tonneaux
- Tons burthen: 1,537 port tonneaux
- Length: 55.87 m (183 ft 4 in)
- Beam: 14.46 m (47 ft 5 in)
- Draught: 7.15 m (23.5 ft)
- Depth of hold: 7.15 m (23 ft 5 in)
- Sail plan: Full-rigged ship
- Crew: 705
- Armament: 74 guns: Lower gun deck: 28 × 36 pdr guns; Upper gun deck: 30 × 18 pdr guns; Forecastle and Quarterdeck: 16–28 × 8 pdr guns and 36 pdr carronades

Provence was a 74-gun Téméraire-class ship of the line built for the French Navy during the 1810s. First commissioned in 1825, she participated in the Invasion of Algiers in 1830.

== Description ==
Designed by Jacques-Noël Sané, the Téméraire-class ships had a length of 55.87 metres (183 ft 4 in), a beam of 14.46 metres (47 ft 5 in) and a depth of hold of 7.15 metres (23 ft 5 in). The ships displaced 3,069 tonneaux and had a mean draught of 7.15 metres (23 ft 5 in). They had a tonnage of 1,537 port tonneaux. Their crew numbered 705 officers and ratings during wartime. They were fitted with three masts and ship rigged.

The muzzle-loading, smoothbore armament of the Téméraire class consisted of twenty-eight 36-pounder long guns on the lower gun deck and thirty 18-pounder long guns on the upper gun deck. After about 1807, the armament on the quarterdeck and forecastle varied widely between ships with differing numbers of 8-pounder long guns and 36-pounder carronades. The total number of guns varied between sixteen and twenty-eight. The 36-pounder obusiers formerly mounted on the poop deck (dunette) in older ships were removed as obsolete.

== Construction and career ==
Her keel was laid down in Toulon in 1812 as Kremlin. During her construction, she was renamed Provence during the Bourbon Restoration, Hercule briefly during the Hundred Days, when she was launched, and back to Provence from July 1815. The ship was completed in August 1815, but she was not commissioned until 1 April 1825.

She sustained heavy damage when she collided with her sister ship Scipion which was returning from the Battle of Navarino, and had to return to Toulon for repairs. After the "fan incident", she sailed for Algiers to attempt talks, arriving on 3 August 1829. In July 1830, she was the flagship of Vice-admiral Duperré for the Invasion of Algiers in 1830. On 17 July 1830, she was renamed Alger to celebrate the capitulation of the city. In 1831, the ship took part in the Battle of the Tagus, under Captain Jacques Leblanc, and later in the Crimean War, bombarding Sevastopol. From 1855, she was used as a hospital ship, and was eventually broken up in 1881.

== Bibliography ==
- Roche, Jean-Michel (2005). Dictionnaire des bâtiments de la flotte de guerre française de Colbert à nos jours [Dictionary of French Warships from Colbert to Today]. Vol. 1: 1671-1870. Roche. ISBN 978-2-9525917-0-6. OCLC 165892922.
- Winfield, Rif and Roberts, Stephen S. (2015) French Warships in the Age of Sail 1786-1861: Design, Construction, Careers and Fates. Seaforth Publishing. ISBN 978-1-84832-204-2
