= Albin Roussin =

French Navy officer and politician

Baron Albin Roussin
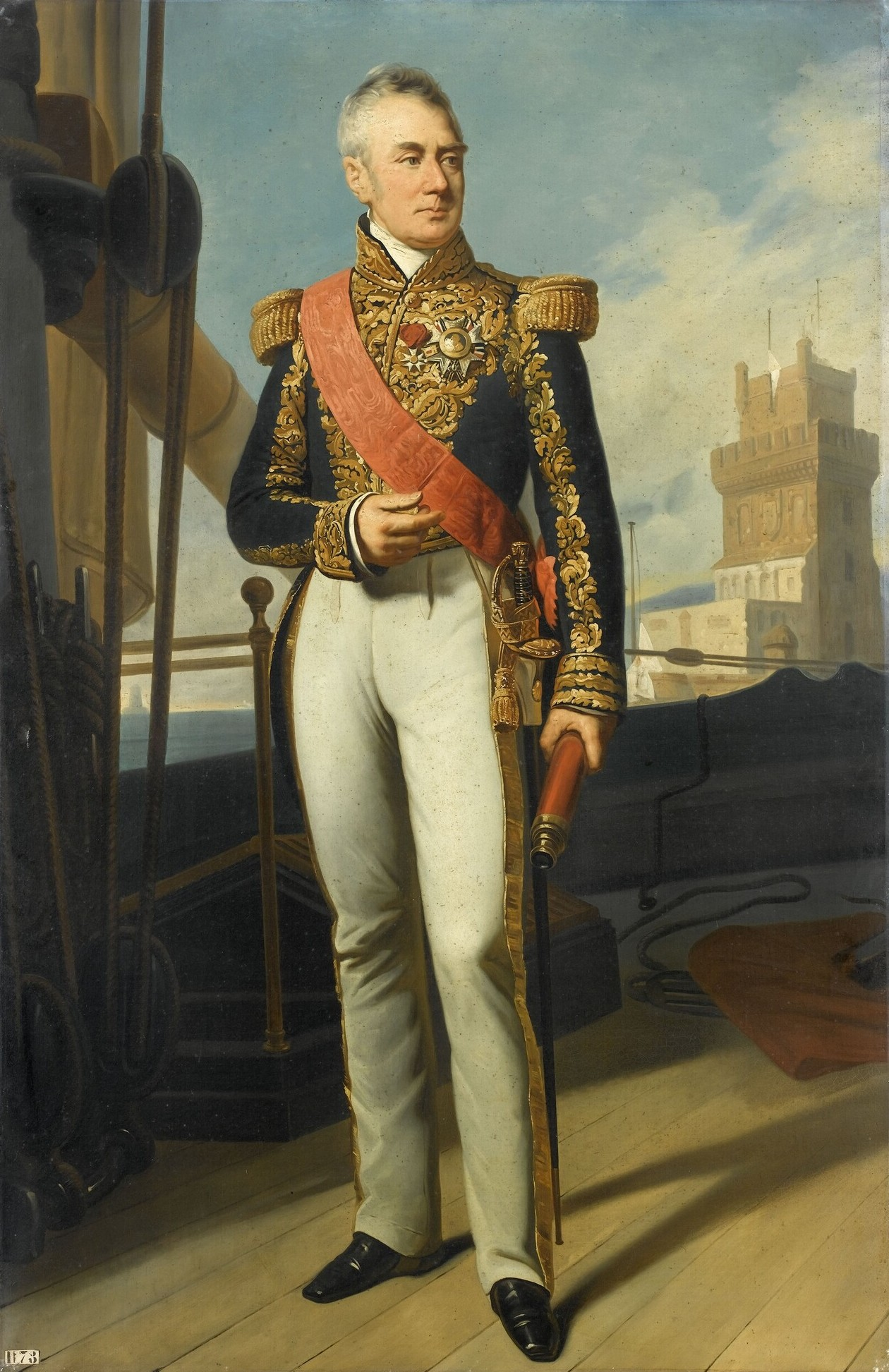
- Portrait by Charles Philippe Larivière, 1831
- Born: 21 April 1781; Dijon, Kingdom of France
- Died: 21 February 1854 (aged 72); Paris, Second French Empire
- Burial place: Père Lachaise Cemetery
- Military career
- Allegiance: French First Republic; First French Empire; Bourbon Restoration; July Monarchy
- Branch: French Navy
- Service years: 1793–1840
- Rank: Admiral of France
- Units: Minerve; Iéna; Sémillante
- Commands: École navale Roussin's squadron (Portugal); Brazilian squadron South American squadron Jean Bart; Gloire; La Corée
- Conflicts: Napoleonic Wars; War of the Third Coalition; Napoleon's planned invasion of the United Kingdom; Mauritius campaign of 1809–1811; Battle of Grand Port; Liberal Wars; Battle of the Tagus (1831)
- Awards: Honorary gentleman of the King’s chamber Grand Cross of the Legion of Honour; Commander of the Order of Saint Louis; Commander of the Order of the Cruzeiro; Knight of the Order of Saint Vladimir
- Other work: Minister of the Navy

Admiral of France Albin Reine Roussin (21 April 1781 – 21 February 1854) was a French Navy officer and politician.

== Republic and Empire ==
His father was a lawyer who was arrested during the French Revolution when Roussin was aged twelve. He left home in Dijon and travelled to Dunkerque where he enlisted as a cadet in the French Navy in December 1793. He served from 1794 to 1797 on various frigates. In 1801 he sat and passed the midshipman's exam following two lessons from the hydrographer Jean Petit-Genet.

His first posting as an officer was to command a gunboat at Antwerp, part of the "National Flotilla" of coastal ships, collecting in various Channel ports for Napoleon's planned invasion of the United Kingdom. By 1803 he was promoted to ensign and embarked aboard the frigate Sémillante under the command of Captain Léonard-Bernard Motard. They would spend six years in the Indian Ocean, based on Réunion, preying on British shipping bound to and from India.

The worn-out Sémillante was paid off at Mauritius in 1808 after sustaining damage in a fight with the British frigate HMS Terpsichore. Roussin was promoted to lieutenant and posted to the corvette Iéna. A cruise in the Persian Gulf and the Bay of Bengal ended when the Iéna encountered the British frigate HMS Modeste off Calcutta and was captured after a two-hour engagement on 8 October 1808. Roussin and his captain, Lieutenant Maurice, were exchanged at the end of 1809 and returned to Réunion. Roussin was appointed second in command to Bouvet de Maisonneuve aboard the frigate Minerve, a prize taken by Guy-Victor Duperré. Roussin received a mention in Bouvet's dispatches for his conduct during the battle of Grand Port in August 1810. However, the French success at Grand Port was only a temporary setback to British plans to conquer Mauritius and Réunion, and Governor Comte Decaen finally signed a capitulation in December.

Roussin was repatriated to France, where he met the Emperor, who confirmed his promotion to captain and presented him with the légion d'honneur. Roussin was posted to command the frigate Gloire fitting out at Le Havre. After training, he cruised in the Atlantic Ocean from December 1812 to April 1813, taking fifteen prizes, including two sloops.

== Bourbon rule ==
Under the restored monarchy of Louis XVIII, Roussin was promoted again and made a Chevalier de St Louis. When Napoleon returned to power during the Hundred Days, he was dismissed, but returned to service when Louis XVIII was again restored.

Following the wrecking of the frigate Méduse off the Senegal coast in 1816, Roussin was given the task of surveying the African coast from Senegal to Guinea by Minister of Marine Count Molé. Following this, he surveyed the mouth of the River Amazon in 1819. He was made a Baron in 1820. In 1821 he took a squadron to South America, ostensibly to protect French trade, but with secret instructions to seek a quarrel with the forces fighting for independence from Spain led by Simón Bolívar, Bernardo O'Higgins and José de San Martín. Returning to France in 1822, he was promoted to rear admiral. From 1824 until 1827 he served in administrative posts ashore.

Roussin returned to sea in May 1828, flying his flag aboard the ship of the line Jean Bart. He led a squadron to Brazil to persuade, through gunboat diplomacy if need be, the Brazilian Emperor Pedro I to pay compensation for French ships captured by the Brazilian Navy during the Cisplatine War. He arrived off Rio de Janeiro on 5 July 1828 and simply sailed into the harbour, ignoring the guns at the entrance, anchoring off the city. After saluting the Brazilian flag, he requested and received an audience with Emperor Pedro where the damages to be paid to French shipowners were agreed. On his return to France, Roussin was congratulated for solving the problem by diplomacy, and was appointed by King Charles X to the honorary post of Gentleman of the bedchamber.

On 25 January 1830 he was elected to the French Academy of Sciences in recognition of his work on geography and navigation. He would later serve as member of the Bureau studying longitudes. Later in 1830 he turned the offer of commanding the naval force which supported Bourmont's attack on Algiers.

== Louis-Philippe ==
The July Revolution which brought Louis-Philippe to the throne, unlike the return of Napoleon in 1815, did not interrupt Roussin's career. He was given responsibility for personnel at the Navy Ministry, in which post he oversaw the creation of the École Navale at Brest.

He served as Minister of Marine from 1 March 1840 to 29 October 1840 and again from 7 February 1843 to 24 July 1843 when he retired due to ill-health.

== Family ==
Roussin married in 1814 with Illumante Bihet Pontigny. They had two daughters and a son, Albert, who was later an admiral and also served as Minister of Marine.

Preceded by Guy-Victor Duperré	Minister of Marine; 1 March 1840–29 October 1840	Succeeded by Guy-Victor Duperré
Preceded by Guy-Victor Duperré	Minister of Marine; 7 February 1843–24 July 1843	Succeeded by Ange René Armand de Mackau
