= French frigate Melpomène (1828) =

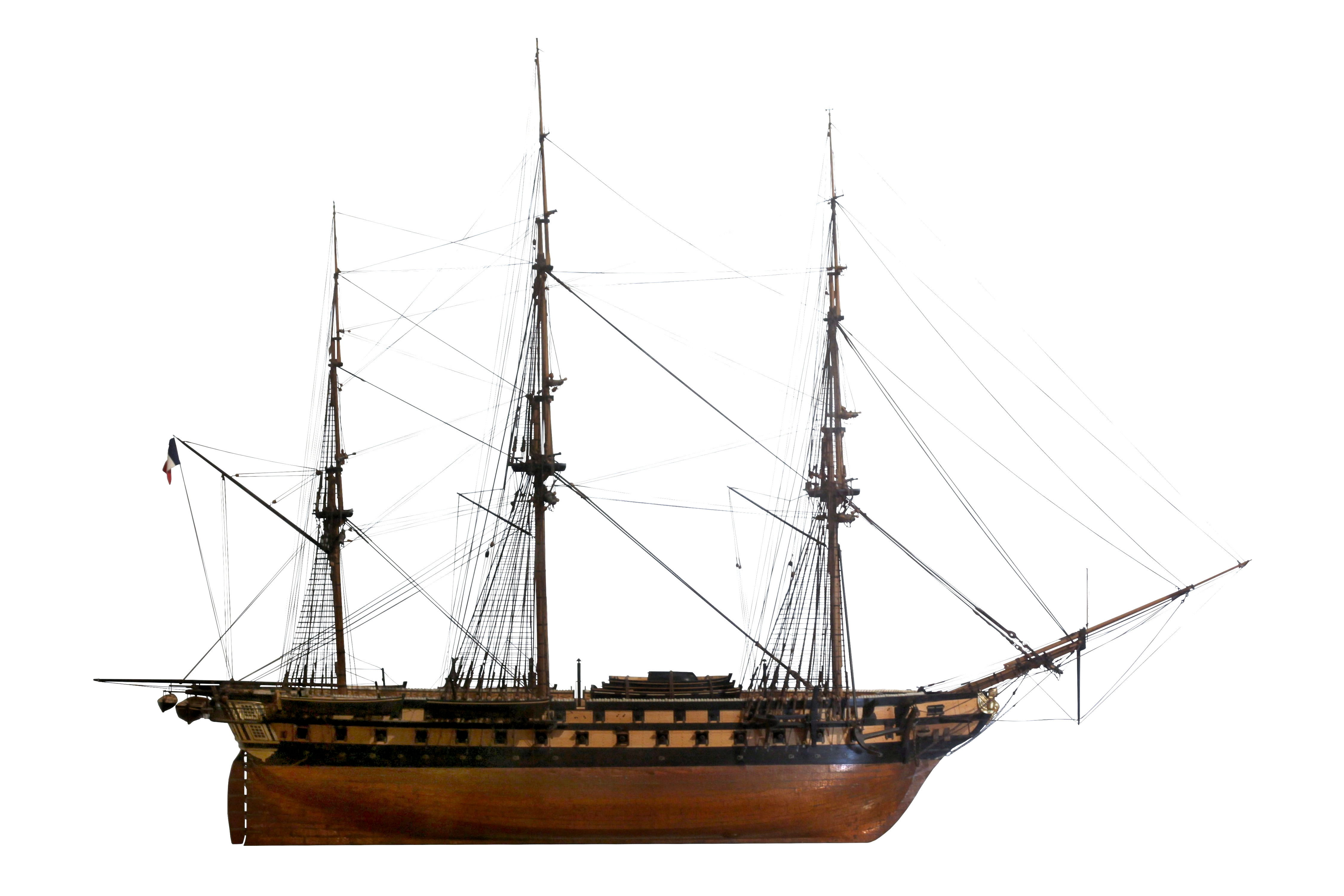
- Model showing characteristics and original painting scheme of Belle Poule, sister-ship of the French frigate Melpomène (1828). Model on display at Toulon naval museum.

History

France
- Name: Melpomène
- Namesake: Melpomene
- Builder: Cherbourg
- Laid down: 17 May 1825
- Launched: 28 July 1828
- Commissioned: 1 March 1830
- Decommissioned: 1 October 1833
- Out of service: 1845
- Stricken: 1870
- Fate: Scrapped

General characteristics
Class & type	Surveillante-class frigate
Displacement	2500 tonnes
Length	54 metres (177 ft)
Beam	14.10 metres (46.3 ft)
Draught	3.80 metres (12.5 ft)
Propulsion	sail
Complement	301
Armament	60 guns; 32 × 30-pounder long guns; 4 × 80-pounder Paixhans guns; 24 × 30-pounder carronades
Armour	Timber

Melpomène was a Surveillante class 60-gun first rank frigate of the French Navy.

== Career ==
Melpomène was commissioned in March 1830, in time to take part in the Invasion of Algiers in 1830, and was decommissioned on 28 October after the events.

The next year, on 7 February, she was recommissioned amidst growing tensions with Portugal, and she took part in the blockade, and the subsequent Battle of the Tagus, under Captain de Rabaudy. Arrived the first French warship, she was also the last to depart.

== Fate ==
In October 1833, she was again decommissioned, never to serve again. She was condemned in 1845, and used as a masting crane in Toulon under the name Travailleuse from 1865.
