= Battle of the Tagus =

Battle of the Tagus may refer to:

- Battle of the Tagus (220 BC) – Battle between the Carpetanians and Carthage led by Hannibal in preparation for the Second Punic War
- Battle of the Tagus (153 BC) – Battle between the Lusitanians and Romans during the Lusitanian War
- Naval Battle of the Tejo – Naval battle between Portugal and Castile during the 1383–1385 Crisis
- Battle of the Tagus (1831) – Battle between the French and the Miguelites during the Liberal Wars
