= List of shipwrecks in November 1854 =

The list of shipwrecks in November 1854 includes ships sunk, foundered, wrecked, grounded, or otherwise lost during November 1854.

== 1 November ==
List of shipwrecks: 1 November 1854
Ship	State	Description
Giovannina	Austrian Empire	The barque was lost at "Chili" on the Black Sea coast.
Louisa	United Kingdom	The ship foundered off Gurnard Head, Cornwall. Her crew and the ship's dog were rescued.

== 2 November ==
List of shipwrecks: 2 November 1854
Ship	State	Description
Eliza	United Kingdom	The full-rigged ship was driven into James Turcan (United Kingdom) and was severely damaged at Bombay, India.
Forfarshire	United Kingdom	The ship ran aground and sank at Bombay. She was on a voyage from London to Bombay.
George Russell Clark	United Kingdom	The steamship was wrecked at Bombay.
Hastings	United Kingdom	The ship sank at Bombay.
Imaum	Muscat and Oman	The full-rigged ship was damaged at Bombay.
Jamsetjie Jejeebhoy	India	The ship was wrecked at Bombay.
Margaret	United Kingdom	The ship sank at Bombay.
Pampero	(United Kingdom of Great Britain and Ireland) British North America	The ship was abandoned in the Atlantic Ocean. Her 25 crew were rescued by the brig Stirlingshire (United Kingdom). Pampero was on a voyage from Quebec City, Province of Canada to the Clyde.
Phlox	United Kingdom	The ship was driven ashore and wrecked at Bombay.
Snake	India	The steamship sank at Bombay.

== 3 November ==
List of shipwrecks: 3 November 1854
Ship	State	Description
Anna Catherina	Sweden	The ship ran aground on the Sharlakansgrund, in the Baltic Sea. She was on a voyage from Stockholm to Antwerp, Belgium. She was refloated and resumed her voyage.

== 4 November ==
List of shipwrecks: 4 November 1854
Ship	State	Description
Nouveau Prosperitas	Belgium	The schooner was driven ashore and capsized at Memel, Prussia.
Ondernemung	Netherlands	The ship was wrecked in the Dockegat. Her crew were rescued. She was on a voyage from Königsberg, Prussia to Amsterdam, North Holland.
Prince Albert	United Kingdom	The ship was in collision with a barque and sank in the English Channel off Dungeness, Kent with the loss of all but one of her crew.

== 5 November ==
List of shipwrecks: 7 October 1900
Ship	State	Description
Abadidschi, or Abadid Schibad	Egyptian Navy	Crimean War: Siege of Sevastopol: The ship was sunk at Sevastopol, Russia with the loss of more than 700 lives.
Amor	Netherlands	The ship was driven ashore at Harboøre, Denmark. She was on a voyage from Nykjobing, Denmark to Schiedam, South Holland.
Charlotte	United Kingdom	The troopship Charlotte was underway from Queenstown, County Cork to Calcutta, India, and had called in at Port Elizabeth, Cape Colony when a storm caused her to break free of both anchors. She wrecked on rocks on the foreshore with the loss of 62 soldiers, 11 women and 26 children.
Robert Syers	United Kingdom	The barque caught fire at Sydney, New South Wales and was quickly destroyed; she was newly arrived from San Francisco, California with timber.
Speedwell	United Kingdom	The ship ran aground on Sheep Island, Pembrokeshire. She floated off but consequently sank. Her crew survived. She was on a voyage from Neath, Glamorgan to Liverpool, Lancashire.

== 6 November ==
List of shipwrecks: 6 November 1854
Ship	State	Description
Europa	United Kingdom	The steamship capsized and sank in the East India Docks, London. She was righted and refloated on 10 November.
Exile	(United Kingdom of Great Britain and Ireland) British North America	The schooner struck a sunken rock and foundered in Lobster Bay. Her crew were rescued. She was on a voyage from Liverpool, Nova Scotia to Saint John, New Brunswick.
Georgia	United Kingdom	The ship was abandoned in the Atlantic Ocean (42°50′N 45°50′W). Her crew were rescued by Rosina (United Kingdom. Georgia was on a voyage from Newcastle upon Tyne, Northumberland to Boston, Massachusetts, United States.
Isa	United Kingdom	The barque was wrecked on the English Bank, in the River Plate. Her crew survived. She was on a voyage from Glasgow, Renfrewshire to Buenos Aires, Argentina.
Johanne	Bremen	The ship was wrecked on Spiekeroog, Kingdom of Hanover. Of her crew and 222 passengers, her crew and 138 passengers were reported to have been rescued and fifteen people killed. She was on a voyage from Bremen to Baltimore, Maryland, United States.
Jonge Hero	Prussia	The ship was driven ashore and wrecked on Ameland, Friesland, Netherlands. She was on a voyage from Kiel to King's Lynn, Norfolk, United Kingdom.
Rob Roy	United Kingdom	The brig was abandoned in the North Sea off Heligoland. Her crew were rescued by the steamship Hamburgh (Hamburg). Rob Roy was on a voyage from Hamburg to South Shields, County Durham.
Warrior Queen	United Kingdom	The ship ran aground on the English Bank. She was refloated.

== 7 November ==
List of shipwrecks: 7 November 1854
Ship	State	Description
Elizabeth	(United Kingdom of Great Britain and Ireland) British North America	The schooner was wrecked on the south coast of "Peters Island". She was on a voyage from Saint John, New Brunswick to Sydney, Nova Scotia.

== 8 November ==
List of shipwrecks: 8 November 1854
Ship	State	Description
Integrity	United Kingdom	The ship was wrecked on the Longsand, in the North Sea off the coast of Essex. Her crew were rescued. She was on a voyage from London to Antwerp, Belgium.
Victoria	United Kingdom	The ship ran aground at Campbeltown, Argyllshire. She was on a voyage from the Clyde to Lisbon, Portugal. She was refloated and resumed her voyage.

== 9 November ==
List of shipwrecks: 9 November 1854
Ship	State	Description
Burrells	United Kingdom	The ship was driven ashore near Gallipoli, Ottoman Empire. She was on a voyage from Newport, Monmouthshire to Constantinople, Ottoman Empire.

== 10 November ==
List of shipwrecks: 10 November 1854
Ship	State	Description
Adolf	Duchy of Holstein	The ship ran aground in the Eider. She was on a voyage from Newcastle upon Tyne, Northumberland, United Kingdom to Neustadt in Holstein. She was refloated with the assistance of Royal Victoria (United Kingdom).
Evangelistria	Netherlands	The ship struck a sunken wreck and foundered at Kertch, Russia. Her crew were rescued.

== 11 November ==
List of shipwrecks: 11 November 1854
Ship	State	Description
Clyde	United Kingdom	The ship was wrecked on a reef off "Point Calan". Her crew survived. She was on a voyage from Manila, Spanish East Indies to Hong Kong.
Granville Bay	United Kingdom	The ship was driven ashore and wrecked near Waterford. She was on a voyage from Fleetwood, Lancashire to Dalhousie, New Brunswick, British North America.
Jantina	Netherlands	The ship departed from Newcastle upon Tyne, Northumberland, United Kingdom for Kampen, Friesland. No further trace, presumed foundered with the loss of all hands.
Jewess	United States	The 200-foot (61.0 m) sidewheel paddle steamer was driven ashore in a storm and dense fog close to shore along the southeastern coast of New Jersey during a voyage from Cuba to New York City with a cargo that included oranges and cigars. She broke up, but her entire crew survived by launching her lifeboats and rowing to shore.
William and Ann	United Kingdom	The ship was driven ashore at Mousehole, Cornwall. She was on a voyage from a Welsh port to Mousehole. She was refloated and taken in to Mousehole.

== 12 November ==
List of shipwrecks: 12 November 1854
Ship	State	Description
Andrews	United Kingdom	The brig was driven ashore in the Somme. She was on a voyage from Cork to London. She was refloated.
Caroline	Sweden	The ship was wrecked near Heilinghafen, Duchy of Schleswig. Her crew were rescued. She was on a voyage from Kalmar to Flensburg, Duchy of Holstein.
Egbertus	Danzig	The ship was driven ashore on Læsø, Denmark. She was on a voyage from Danzig to Liverpool, Lancashire, United Kingdom. She was refloated and put in to Fredrikshavn, Denmark.
Jane	United Kingdom	The brig ran aground off Lâpseki, Ottoman Empire. She was on a voyage from Newcastle upon Tyne, Northumberland to Constantinople, Ottoman Empire. She was refloated.
Oxefia	United Kingdom	The ship was wrecked on the Haisborough Sands, in the North Sea off the coast of Norfolk with the loss of twelve lives.
Wynnstay	United Kingdom	The transport ship was driven ashore and wrecked at St. Stefano Point, Ottoman Empire.

== 13 November ==
List of shipwrecks: 13 November 1854
Ship	State	Description
Agenoria	United Kingdom	The ship ran aground at Ryde, Isle of Wight. She was on a voyage from London to Cork. She was refloated.
Amelia	United Kingdom	The ship was driven ashore and wrecked at Lyme Regis, Dorset.
Hanna	United Kingdom	The ship was driven ashore near Varberg, Sweden. She was on a voyage from Memel, Prussia to Southampton, Hampshire. She had been refloated by 21 November.
Mars	(United Kingdom of Great Britain and Ireland) Jersey	The cutter collided with the cutter Primrose (United Kingdom) and sank off Guernsey, Channel Islands. Her crew were rescued. She was refloated on 18 November and taken in to Guernsey.
New Era	United States	Bound from Bremen to New York City on the return leg of her maiden voyage with about 500 passengers and crew on board, the 1,300-ton full-rigged ship was wrecked 100 yards (91 m) off Asbury Park, New Jersey, during a storm with the loss of about 150 lives. Her anchor was salvaged in 1999 and incorporated into a memorial.
Patriot	United Kingdom	The ship was wrecked. She was on a voyage from London to Antwerp, Belgium.
Prospero	United Kingdom	The ship was wrecked on Terschelling, Friesland, Netherlands. Her crew were rescued. She was on a voyage from Liverpool, Lancashire to Hamburg.

== 14 November ==
List of shipwrecks: 14 November 1854
Ship	State	Description
HMS Agamemnon	Royal Navy	Crimean War, Great Storm of 1854: The ship of the line was driven ashore on the Russian coast. She was refloated.
Albatross	United Kingdom	Crimean War, Great Storm of 1854: The steamship was driven ashore and severely damaged at Yevpatoria, Russia.
Asia	United Kingdom	Crimean War, Great Storm of 1854: The troopship, a full-rigged ship, was wrecked in the Black Sea off Yevpatoria. She was subsequently salvaged.
Brenda	United Kingdom	Crimean War, Great Storm of 1854: The steamship was wrecked on the Russian coast.
Bride	United Kingdom	Crimean War, Great Storm of 1854: The ship was severely damaged in the Black Sea.{
HMS Britannia	Royal Navy	Crimean War, Great Storm of 1854: The Caledonia-class ship of the line was driven ashore on the Russian coast.
Caduceus	United Kingdom	Crimean War, Great Storm of 1854: The full-rigged ship was dismasted and abandoned off Balaklava, Russia with the loss of a crew member. She was later refloated and towed in to Constantinople, Ottoman Empire by the steamship Melbourne (United Kingdom) in a severely damaged condition. She arrived on 19 November.
Catherina Elizabeth	Netherlands	The ship was wrecked in the Vlie. Her crew were rescued. She was on a voyage from Fredrikstad, Denmark to Harlingen, Friesland.
Constance	France	Crimean War, Great Storm of 1854: The transport ship was driven ashore and wrecked 5 nautical miles (9.3 km) north of Yevpatoria. Her crew were rescued by HMS Bellerophon (Royal Navy). Constance was subsequently set afire by the Russians.
Cornwallis	United Kingdom	Crimean War, Great Storm of 1854: The store ship was severely damaged at the Golden Horn, Ottoman Empire.
Coronella	United Kingdom	Crimean War, Great Storm of 1854: The ship was severely damaged at the Golden Horn.
Culloden	United Kingdom	Crimean War, Great Storm of 1854: The transport ship was driven ashore and wrecked at Yevpatoria. All on board were rescued, but were taken prisoner of war by the Russians.
Danube	United Kingdom	Crimean War, Great Storm of 1854: The steam tug was driven ashore in Kamisch Bay. Her crew were rescued.
Diamond	Royal Navy	Crimean War, Great Storm of 1854: The Diamond-class corvette was driven ashore at Balaklava.
El Malti	Malta	Crimean War, Great Storm of 1854: The brig was lost in the Black Sea with the loss of all hands.
Ganges	United Kingdom	Crimean War, Great Storm of 1854: The troopship, a full-rigged ship, was driven into Pyrenees (United Kingdom) and HMS Sampson (Royal Navy) and was then ashore and wrecked at the mouth of the Katcha River on the coast of Russia. Her crew were rescued. Ganges was subsequently set afire.
Georgiana	United Kingdom	Crimean War, Great Storm of 1854: The troopship, a full-rigged ship, was wrecked in the Black Sea off Yevpatoria.
Glendalough	United Kingdom	Crimean War, Great Storm of 1854: The troopship, a full-rigged ship, was wrecked in the Black Sea off Yevpatoria. She was subsequently salvaged.
Harbinger	United Kingdom	Crimean War, Great Storm of 1854: The troopship, a full-rigged ship, was driven ashore and wrecked at Yevpatoria.
Helianthus	United Kingdom	The brig was wrecked in the Rio Grande. Her crew were rescued. She was on a voyage from Cardiff, Glamorgan to the Rio Grande.
Henri IV	French Navy	Henri IV. Crimean War, Great Storm of 1854: The ship-of-the-line was driven ashore and wrecked at Yevpatoria. Her crew were taken prisoner of war by the Russians. The wreck was set afire and burnt.
Her Majesty	United Kingdom	Crimean War, Great Storm of 1854: The troopship, a full-rigged ship, was wrecked in the Black Sea off Yevpatoria. She was subsequently salvaged.
Iéna	French Navy	Crimean War, Great Storm of 1854: The Commerce de Paris-class ship of the line was driven ashore in the Dardanelles.
Ionia	United Kingdom	The schooner was wrecked on the Goodwin Sands, Kent. Her crew were rescued by a Deal lugger. She was on a voyage from Youghal, County Cork to London.
Jason	United Kingdom	Crimean War, Great Storm of 1854: The steamship was reported to have been driven ashore and holed at Yevpatoria. The report was subsequently denied by her owners, the General Screw Steam Shipping Company.
Kenilworth	United Kingdom	Crimean War, Great Storm of 1854: The troopship, a full-rigged ship, was wrecked in the Black Sea off Balaklava with the loss of all on board.
Lady Valiant	United Kingdom	Crimean War, Great Storm of 1854: The full-rigged steamship was dismasted and otherwise damaged off Balaklava.
Lisleadan	Malta	Crimean War, Great Storm of 1854: The brig foundered in the Black Sea. Her crew survived.
Lord Raglan	United Kingdom	Crimean War, Great Storm of 1854: The troopship, a full-rigged ship, was driven ashore and wrecked at the mouth of the Katcha River. Her crew were rescued.
Marquess, or Marquis	United Kingdom	Crimean War, Great Storm of 1854: The troopship was wrecked in the Black Sea off Balaklava with the loss of all on board.
Mary Anne	United Kingdom	Crimean War, Great Storm of 1854: The troopship foundered in the Black Sea off Balaklava with the loss of all on board.
Medora	United Kingdom	Crimean War, Great Storm of 1854: The full-rigged ship was dismasted and otherwise damaged off Balaklava.
Medway	United Kingdom	The ship was driven ashore at Balaklava.
Melbourne	United Kingdom	Crimean War, Great Storm of 1854: The steamship was dismasted and otherwise damaged off Balaklava.
Mercia	United Kingdom	Crimean War, Great Storm of 1854: The full-rigged ship was dismasted and otherwise damaged off Balaklava.
Minche	United Kingdom	Crimean War, Great Storm of 1854: The steamship was dismasted and otherwise damaged off Balaklava.
Mines	Greece	Crimean War, Great Storm of 1854: The brig was driven ashore at Kertch, Russia.
Minna	United Kingdom	Crimean War, Great Storm of 1854: The steamship was wrecked on the Russian coast.
Minster	United Kingdom	Crimean War, Great Storm of 1854: The full-rigged ship was dismasted off Balaklava.
Moreton	United Kingdom	Crimean War, Great Storm of 1854: The ship was driven ashore at Balaklava.
Ocean	United Kingdom	Crimean War, Great Storm of 1854: The full-rigged ship was dismasted and otherwise damaged of Balaklava.
Oscar	Sweden	The sloop was driven ashore and wrecked on Öland. Her crew were rescued. She was on a voyage from Gothenburg to Stockholm.
Peiki Messeret	Egyptian Navy	Crimean War, Great Storm of 1854: The steam frigate was wrecked at Yevpatoria.
Peltona	United Kingdom	Crimean War, Great Storm of 1854: The barque sank at Balaklava. All on board were rescued.
Pluton	French Navy	Crimean War, Great Storm of 1854: The Pluton-class corvette was driven ashore and wrecked at Yevpatoria.
Pride of the Ocean	United Kingdom	Crimean War, Great Storm of 1854: The full-rigged ship was dismasted and otherwise damaged off Balaklava. She was abandoned.
HMS Prince	Royal Navy	HMS Prince. Crimean War, Great Storm of 1854: The storeship foundered in the Black Sea off Balaklava with the loss of 144 of her 150 crew. She was one of many ships lost in the anchorage when a storm with hurricane-force winds arrived. While she had both steam and sail, she had to cut away her masts due to the power of the storm and her mizzen mast rigging fouled her propeller, rendering her steam power useless. She was valued at £150,000, and her cargo – stores for the winter siege of Sevastopol – at £500,000.
Progress	United Kingdom	Crimean War, Great Storm of 1854: The troopship was driven ashore and wrecked at Balaklava with the loss of 20 of her 26 crew.
Pyrenees	United Kingdom	Crimean War, Great Storm of 1854: The troopship, a full-rigged ship, was run into by Ganges (United Kingdom) and was then driven into HMS Sampson (Royal Navy). She was set adrift, driven ashore and wrecked at the mouth of the Katcha River. Her crew were rescued by HMS Sampson. Pyreneses was subsequently set afire.
Resolute	United Kingdom	Crimean War, Great Storm of 1854: The storeship, a full-rigged ship, foundered in the Black Sea off Balaklava, with the loss of 143 of her 150 crew. She was one of many ships lost in the anchorage when a storm with hurricane-force winds arrived. She had been ordered out of the harbour a few days before the storm by the Admiralty agent in spite of energetic protests by her commanding officer, Captain Lewis, about the danger to her. She became a total loss after first her starboard anchor chain, then her port chain parted in the violent storm. Her cargo of 900 long tons (914 tonnes/metric tons) of gunpowder also was lost.
HMS Retribution	United Kingdom	Crimean War, Great Storm of 1854: The Centaur-class frigate was driven ashore on the Russian coast. She was refloated after throwing her guns overboard and taken in to Constantinople for repairs.
Rip van Winkle	United Kingdom	Crimean War, Great Storm of 1854: The troopship, a full-rigged ship, was wrecked in the Black Sea off Balaklava with the loss of all 60 crew.
Rodsley	United Kingdom	Crimean War, Great Storm of 1854: The troopship, a full-rigged ship, was driven ashore and wrecked at the mouth of the Katcha River on the coast of Russia. All on board were rescued the next day by HMS Sampson (Royal Navy).
Saint Malo	France	Crimean War, Great Storm of 1854: The ship foundered off Balaklava with the loss of all hands.
HMS Sampson	Royal Navy	Crimean War, Great Storm of 1854: The Cyclops-class frigate was driven in to by Ganges and Pyrenees (both United Kingdom) and dismasted off the mouth of the Katcha River. She was later taken in to Constantinople for repairs.
HMS Sans Pareil	Royal Navy	Crimean War, Great Storm of 1854: The second rate was driven ashore at Balaklava. She was later refloated
Satana	France	Crimean War, Great Storm of 1854: The full-rigged ship was lost with all hands.
Sea Nymph	United Kingdom	Crimean War, Great Storm of 1854: The steamship was reported to have foundered in the Black Sea with the loss of all 35 crew. Also reported to have weathered the storm in Balaklava Harbour and subsequently sailing on 17 November to Yevpatoria in order to assist with the refloating on Albatross (United Kingdom and another steamship.
Sibyl	United Kingdom	The brig was wrecked "on the coast of Abasia", Ottoman Empire. Her crew were rescued.
Sir Robert Sale	United Kingdom	Crimean War, Great Storm of 1854: The full-rigged steamship was dismasted and otherwise damaged off Balaklava.
Sovereign	United Kingdom	Crimean War, Great Storm of 1854: The ship was dismasted in the Black Sea.
Sunderland	(United Kingdom of Great Britain and Ireland) British North America	The ship was driven onto the Shag Rocks and damaged. All on board were rescued. She was on a voyage from Windsor, Nova Scotia to Saint John, New Brunswick. Sunderland was subsequently towed in to Saint John.
Tyrone	United Kingdom	Crimean War, Great Storm of 1854: The troopship, a full-rigged ship, sank in the Black Sea off the mouth of the Katcha River. All on board were rescued by HMS London (Royal Navy).
HMS Vesuvius	Royal Navy	Crimean War, Great Storm of 1854: The Stromboli-class sloop was driven ashore and severely damaged at Balaklava. She was later refloated and taken in to Constantinople for repairs.
Victoria	United Kingdom	Crimean War, Great Storm of 1854: The steamship was severely damaged at Balaklava.
Wanderer	United Kingdom	Crimean War, Great Storm of 1854: The troopship, a barque, was wrecked in the Black Sea off Balaklava with the loss of all on board.
Wild Wave	United Kingdom	Crimean War, Great Storm of 1854: The clipper, a full-rigged ship, was wrecked in the Black Sea off Balaklava with the loss of all but one of her 25 crew.
William Penn	United States	Crimean War, Great Storm of 1854: The steamship, in service as a French troopship, was driven ashore in the Dardanelles.
Winnstay	United Kingdom	The ship was driven ashore and wrecked at St. Stefano Point, Constantinople.

== 15 November ==
List of shipwrecks: 15 November 1854
Ship	State	Description
Auckland	United Kingdom	The ship was driven ashore at Sunderland, County Durham. Her crew were rescued.
Belmont	United Kingdom	The ship was driven ashore at Sunderland. Her crew were rescued.
Brilliant	United Kingdom	The ship was driven ashore and wrecked 5 nautical miles (9.3 km) west of Dunbar, Lothian. She was on a voyage from Boston, Lincolnshire to Leith, Lothian.
Calypso	United Kingdom	The barque was abandoned off Sunderland. Her crew were rescued by the Sunderland Lifeboat and she subsequently drove ashore north of Sunderland.
Coldstream	United Kingdom	The ship was driven ashore at Sunderland. Her crew were rescued.
Conqueror	United Kingdom	The ship was driven ashore at Sunderland. Her crew were rescued.
Eliza Emma	United Kingdom	The ship was driven ashore and severely damaged north of Sunderland. Her crew were rescued. She was on a voyage from London to Sunderland. She was refloated on 22 November and beached at Sunderland.
Equivalent	United Kingdom	The ship was driven ashore at Sunderland. Her crew were rescued.
Friendship	United Kingdom	The ship sprang a leak, capsized and sank at Bridlington, Yorkshire. She was on a voyage from Hull, Yorkshire to Kirkcaldy, Fife. She righted herself the next day.
Gertrude	United Kingdom	The ship was wrecked on Cape Breton Island, Nova Scotia, British North America. Her crew were rescued. She was on a voyage from Prince Edward Island, British North America to Cork.
Honiton Packet	United Kingdom	The ship was driven ashore and severely damaged at Sunderland. She was refloated on 21 November and beached.
Improvement	United Kingdom	The ship was driven ashore north of Sunderland. Her crew were rescued. She was on a voyage from London to Sunderland. She was refloated on 21 November.
Independent	United Kingdom	The ship was driven ashore at Sunderland. Her crew were rescued.
Integrity	United Kingdom	The ship was driven ashore at Sunderland. Her crew were rescued.
Isabella	United Kingdom	The ship was driven ashore at Sunderland. Her crew were rescued.
Jane	United Kingdom	The brig ran aground and sank off Lambay Island, County Dublin. She was on a voyage from Liverpool, Lancashire to Drogheda, County Louth.
Jane Erskine	United Kingdom	The brig was driven ashore and wrecked near Redcar, Yorkshire. Her crew were rescued. She was on a voyage from Antwerp, Belgium to Newcastle upon Tyne, Northumberland.
Jean Armide	France	The lugger was driven ashore at Sunderland. Her crew were rescued.
John Wesley	United Kingdom	The ship was driven ashore at Sunderland. Her crew were rescued.
Kate Robertson	United Kingdom	The schooner was wrecked on the Spanish Battery Rocks, on the coast of County Durham. Her crew were rescued by rocket apparatus. She was on a voyage from South Shields, County Durham to Rouen, Seine-Inférieure, France.
Letitia	United Kingdom	The sloop was in collision with the schooner Thomas (United Kingdom) in the Irish Sea. She was abandoned by all but her captain. Her crew were rescued by Thomas; her captain was later rescued by the steamship Windsor (United Kingdom). Letitia was on a voyage from Wexford to Liverpool. She was later refloated and towed in to the River Mersey.
Lively	United Kingdom	The schooner was wrecked on the Spanish Battery Rocks. Her crew were rescued by rocket apparatus. She was on a voyage from King's Lynn, Norfolk to Newcastle upon Tyne.
Margaret	United Kingdom	The ship was driven ashore north of Sunderland. Her crew were rescued. She was on a voyage from Rochester, Kent to Sunderland.
Napoleon III	Prussia	The brig was wrecked on the Spanish Battery Rocks. Her crew were rescued by rocket apparatus. She was on a voyage from London to Newcastle upon Tyne.
Robert	United Kingdom	The ship was abandoned off Conil, Spain. She was on a voyage from Cádiz, Spain to Melbourne, Victoria.
Star	United Kingdom	The ship was driven ashore at Sunderland. Her crew were rescued.
Victoria	United Kingdom	The schooner was driven ashore and wrecked north of Sunderland. Her crew were rescued. She was on a voyage from Harwich, Essex to Sunderland.
Westminster	United Kingdom	The ship was driven ashore north of Sunderland. Her crew were rescued.

== 16 November ==
List of shipwrecks: 16 November 1854
Ship	State	Description
Chase	United Kingdom	The ship was driven ashore on St. George Island, Florida, United States. She was on a voyage from Bristol, Gloucestershire to New Orleans, Louisiana, United States. She was refloated on 22 November and towed in to the East Pass.
Clarisse	United Kingdom	The ship ran aground and was wrecked on the Girdler Sand, off the north coast of Kent, United Kingdom.
Gebroeders Lotschen	Danzig	The ship was sighted off Tønning, Duchy of Holstein whilst on a voyage from Danzig to Amsterdam, North Holland, Netherlands. No further trace, presumed foundered with the loss of all hands.
Ville de Perpignan	France	The steamship was driven ashore and abandoned at Yevpatoria, Russia.

== 17 November ==
List of shipwrecks: 17 November 1854
Ship	State	Description
Claudine	United Kingdom	The ship was driven ashore and wrecked near Bangor, County Down. She was on a voyage from Maryport, Cumberland to Bangor.
Clementine	Stralsund	The schooner was driven ashore and wrecked south of Gourdon, Aberdeenshire. Her seven crew and the ship's dog were rescued by the Coast Guard using rocket apparatus.
Marquis of Bute	United Kingdom	The schooner foundered off Groomsport, County Down with the loss of all hands.
Ville de Paris	French Navy	Ville de Paris. Crimean War: The Océan-class ship of the line was severely damaged by Russian artillery at Sevastopol.

== 18 November ==
List of shipwrecks: 18 November 1854
Ship	State	Description
Alice	United Kingdom	The ship was driven ashore at Derbyhaven, Isle of Man. She was on a voyage from the River Dee to Westport, County Mayo.
Betsey and Margaret	United Kingdom	The ship was wrecked at Hel, Prussia with the loss of two of her five crew. She was on a voyage from Danzig to Grangemouth, Stirlingshire.
Clonmel	United Kingdom	The ship was in collision with Chieftain (United Kingdom) and was abandoned off the Tuskar Rock. She was on a voyage from Liverpool, Lancashire to Cork.
Ellen	United Kingdom	The brig was driven ashore at Lyngså, Denmark. Her crew were rescued. She was on a voyage from Gothenburg, Sweden to London.
Humming Bird	(United Kingdom of Great Britain and Ireland) Saint Vincent	The droghing sloop was wrecked off Mustique. Her crew were rescued.

== 19 November ==
List of shipwrecks: 18 November 1854
Ship	State	Description
Belle	United Kingdom	The brig was abandoned in the Atlantic Ocean. Her crew were rescued. She was on a voyage from Montevideo, Uruguay to an English port.
Superb	United Kingdom	The ship sprang a leak and was abandoned 40 nautical miles (74 km) east of Ertholmene, Denmark. Her crew were rescued. She was on a voyage from Danzig to London.

== 20 November ==
List of shipwrecks: 20 November 1854
Ship	State	Description
Ann Eliza	United Kingdom	The brig struck rocks at Campos, Spain and capsized with the loss of five of her crew. She was on a voyage from Hartlepool, County Durham to Marseille, Bouches-du-Rhône, France.
Bucephalus	United States	The steamship was wrecked near Detroit, Michigan with the loss of nearly twenty lives.
Conductor	(United Kingdom of Great Britain and Ireland) British North America	The schooner ran aground and was wrecked in Lake Erie. Her eight crew were rescued. She was on a voyage from Amherstburg to Toronto, Province of Canada.
James	United Kingdom	The ship struck a rock in Ramsey Sound. She was on a voyage from Glasgow, Renfrewshire to Porthcawl, Glamorgan. She put in to Milford Haven, Pembrokeshire in a damaged condition.
Mary Graham	United Kingdom	The barque was driven ashore and wrecked near Sunderland, County Durham with the loss of 23 of her 24 crew. She was on a voyage from Sunderland to Constantinople, Ottoman Empire.
New Hope, and Miss Smith	United Kingdom	The sloops were in collision off the Calf of Man, Isle of Man. Both vessels were abandoned. Miss Smith was on a voyage from Glasgow to Runcorn, Cheshire.

== 21 November ==
List of shipwrecks: 21 November 1854
Ship	State	Description
Amelia	United Kingdom	The ship was driven ashore at Hillsborough Point, Devon. Her crew were rescued. She was on a voyage from Pembrey, Carmarthenshire to Hayle, Cornwall.
Britannia	United Kingdom	The schooner ran aground and sank at Rock Ferry, Cheshire. Her crew were rescued.
Isabella	United Kingdom	The schooner was driven ashore at Ayr. She was on a voyage from Liverpool, Lancashire to Ayr. She was refloated on 27 November and taken in to Ayr.
Meridian	United Kingdom	The ship ran aground leaving Par, Cornwall for Llanelly, Glamorgan. She consequently put in to Fowey, Cornwall in a leaky condition. 2w
Pehr	Norway	The schooner was driven ashore near Mandal. She had become a wreck by 23 December.

== 22 November ==
List of shipwrecks: 22 November 1854
Ship	State	Description
Anne Marie	Kingdom of Hanover	The ship was wrecked on the Hubert Sandbank, in the North Sea. She was on a voyage from Cardiff, Glamorgan, United Kingdom to Leer.
Antje and Jantje	Sweden	The ship ran aground on the Shipwash Sand, in the North Sea off the coast of Essex, United Kingdom. She was on a voyage from Stockholm to Liverpool, Lancashire, United Kingdom. She was refloated and assisted in to Harwich, Essex by two smacks.
Aquarius	United Kingdom	The ship was driven ashore on "Normandsage", Denmark. She was on a voyage from Danzig to Liverpool. She was refloated on 30 November and taken in to Aalborg, Denmark.
Coke	United Kingdom	The ship was driven ashore at Wells-next-the-Sea, Norfolk. She was on a voyage from Wells-next-the-Sea to Hull, Yorkshire.
Eliza	United Kingdom	The ship ran aground on the West Barrows, in the North Sea off the coast of Essex. She was on a voyage from a Baltic port to London. She was refloated.
Protezione	Kingdom of Sardinia	The full-rigged ship ran aground on the Scroby Sands, Norfolk. She was on a voyage from Newcastle upon Tyne, Northumberland, United Kingdom to Genoa. She was refloated and taken in to Great Yarmouth, Norfolk.

== 23 November ==
List of shipwrecks: 23 November 1854
Ship	State	Description
Fenna	Netherlands	The galiot ran aground on the Herd Sand, in the North Sea off the coast of County Durham, United Kingdom. She was on a voyage from Danzig to Sunderland, County Durham.
Harmonie	Netherlands	The galiot ran aground and capsized in the River Tyne. She was refloated.
Julia	United Kingdom	The ship was wrecked at the mouth of the Gironde with the loss of four of her crew. She was on a voyage from Cardiff, Glamorgan to Bordeaux, Gironde.
Lady Delaval	United Kingdom	The ship was abandoned in the North Sea off the coast of Yorkshire. Three crew took to a boat, but were drowned when it capsized.
Margaret Campbell	United Kingdom	The sloop capsized and sank in the North Sea off Newbiggin, Northumberland with the loss of all hands.
Mary Muir	United Kingdom	The ship was in collision with the full-rigged ship Collodia (United Kingdom) and was driven ashore at Hartlepool, County Durham. Her 23 crew were rescued. She was on a voyage from Hartlepool to Sunderland, County Durham and Constantinople, Ottoman Empire. She became a wreck on 22 January 1855.
Munster Lass	United Kingdom	The sloop struck a sunken rock and sank at Queenstown, County Cork. She was on a voyage from Queenstown to Youghal, County Cork.
Panope	France	The ship was wrecked at Manney, Alderney, Channel Islands with the loss of three of her crew.
Robert and Alice	United Kingdom	The smack foundered in Wick Bay with the loss of all hands. A message in a bottle washed up at Peterhead, Aberdeenshire on 25 November.
Tourist	United Kingdom	The steamship ran aground at Great Yarmouth, Norfolk whilst avoiding a collision with a fishing smack. She was on a voyage from Great Yarmouth to London.
West Chirton	United Kingdom	The ship ran aground on the Herd Sand.
William	United Kingdom	The ship was driven ashore, capsized and sank at Hartlepool, County Durham. Her crew were rescued by the Hartlepool Lifeboat. She was on a voyage from the River Tyne to London.
William and Ann	United Kingdom	The sloop was run down and sunk in Plymouth Sound by Nile (United Kingdom) with the loss of one of her two crew. The survivor was rescued by Nile. William and Ann was on a voyage from Plymouth, Devon to Looe, Cornwall.

== 24 November ==
List of shipwrecks: 24 November 1854
Ship	State	Description
Ariel	Netherlands	The ship collided with Feyenoord (Netherlands) and sank. Her crew were rescued. She was on a voyage from "Villa Nova" to Vlaardingen, South Holland.
Atlas	United Kingdom	The ship was driven ashore at Blyth, Northumberland. Her crew were rescued. She was on a voyage from Dunkirk, Nord to Blyth. She was refloated on 5 December.
Bayadere	United Kingdom	The schooner foundered in the North Sea with the loss of all hands. She was on a voyage from the River Tyne to Bayonne, Basses-Pyrénées.
Chevalier	United Kingdom	The paddle steamer ran aground on the Iron Skerry Rock, in the Sound of Jura. She was abandoned on 28 November. Her crew were rescued by Islay (United Kingdom) and she subsequently became a wreck.
Gutenberg	Flag unknown	The ship was run ashore of Isla Aves, Venezuela. She was on a voyage from Liverpool, Lancashire, United Kingdom to Puerto Cabello, Venezuela.
Hope	United Kingdom	The barque was wrecked on a reef off Millevaches, Province of Canada, British North America. She was on a voyage from Quebec City, Province of Canada to Liverpool.
Ocean	United States	The steamship was in collision with RMS Canada (United Kingdom) 25 nautical miles (46 km) off Boston, Massachusetts. She caught fire and then suffered a boiler explosion with the loss of three lives. Survivors were rescued by RMS Canada. Ocean was on a voyage from Boston to Hallowell, Maine.She was declared a total loss.

== 25 November ==
List of shipwrecks: 25 November 1854
Ship	State	Description
Aurora	United Kingdom	The brig was wrecked on the Rosebank, in The Wash. Her crew were rescued. She was on a voyage from Sunderland, County Durham to Dunkirk, Nord, France.
Hedwig	Prussia	The schooner was beached at Grimsby, Lincolnshire, United Kingdom. She was on a voyage from Newcastle upon Tyne, Northumberland, United Kingdom to Helsingør, Denmark.
Johanna	Netherlands	The ship was in collision with a barque and foundered in the English Channel 10 nautical miles (19 km) off Dover, Kent, United Kingdom. Her crew were rescued. She was on a voyage from Liverpool, Lancashire, United Kingdom to Rotterdam, South Holland.
Maria	Sweden	The ship was driven ashore and wrecked on the Heugh Rocks, on the coast of County Durham, United Kingdom with the loss of all five crew. She was on a voyage from Hull, Yorkshire, United Kingdom to Gothenburg.
Mary Ann	United Kingdom	The ship collided with the steamship Nile (United Kingdom) and sank off Plymouth, Devon with the loss of a crew member.
Robert	Prussia	The brig was driven ashore at Hunstanton, Norfolk, United Kingdom.

== 26 November ==
List of shipwrecks: 26 November 1854
Ship	State	Description
Acadia	United States	The ship was wrecked on Cape Sable Island, Nova Scotia, British North America. All 168 people on board were rescued. She was on a voyage from Antwerp, Belgium to New York. Acadia had broken up by 14 December/

== 27 November ==
List of shipwrecks: 27 November 1854
Ship	State	Description
Elizabeth Rose	United Kingdom	The ship was driven ashore on "Amack", Denmark. She was on a voyage from Königsberg, Prussia to Hull, Yorkshire. She was later refloated, and sailed on 30 November for Copenhagen, Denmark.
Model	United Kingdom	The schooner ran aground on the Herd Sand, in the North Sea off the coast of County Durham. She was refloated the next day and towed in to South Shields, County Durham.
Thomas Henry	United Kingdom	The ship departed from Demerara, British Guiana for London. Subsequently foundered in the Atlantic Ocean. Wreckage from the ship washed up at Galley Head, County Cork on 16 February 1855.
Two Brothers	United Kingdom	The ship ran aground on the Spitway, in the Thames Estuary. She was refloated and taken into The Swale.

== 28 November ==
List of shipwrecks: 28 November 1854
Ship	State	Description
Ann Paterno	United Kingdom	The ship ran aground off Walton-on-the-Naze, Essex. She was refloated the next day and resumed her voyage to Hull, Yorkshire.
Czar	United Kingdom	The schooner was abandoned off Liverpool, Lancashire.
Deerslayer	United Kingdom	The full-rigged ship capsized and sank at Pernambuco, Brazil. She was refloated on 5 December.
Earl Douglas	United Kingdom	The ship was wrecked on the Hinder Bank, in the North Sea off the Dutch coast. All on board were rescued by a lifeboat. She was on a voyage from Newcastle upon Tyne, Northumberland to Rotterdam, South Holland, Netherlands.
Progress	United Kingdom	The schooner ran aground on the West Hoyle, in Liverpool Bay. Her crew were rescued. She was refloated, but consequently foundered the next day.
Sunnyside	United States	The full-rigged ship was wrecked near Nassau, Bahamas. She was on a voyage from New Orleans, Louisiana to Liverpool.

== 29 November ==
List of shipwrecks: 29 November 1854
Ship	State	Description
Czar	United Kingdom	The schooner was abandoned in Llandudno Bay. She subsequently drove ashore and was wrecked.
Pauline	France	The ship was wrecked in Caile Creek.
Robert McWilliam	United Kingdom	The ship struck a sunken rock in Kintra Bay, drove ashore and was wrecked. She was on a voyage from Whitehaven, Cumberland to Quebec City, Province of Canada, British North America.
Salacia	United Kingdom	The barque was driven ashore and wrecked on The Rosses, County Donegal. Her crew were rescued. She was on a voyage from Quebec City, Province of Canada, British North America to the Clyde.

== 30 November ==
List of shipwrecks: 30 November 1854
Ship	State	Description
Annie	United Kingdom	The barque was driven ashore at Placentia Harbour, Newfoundland, British North America. She was on a voyage from Charlottetown, Prince Edward Island, British North America to Cork. She was later refloated and taken in to Placentia Harbour.
David R. Aiken	United Kingdom	The brig sprang a leak and foundered between Trinidad and Puerto Cabello, Venezuela. Her crew were rescued.
Hollander	United Kingdom	The brig ran aground on a reef in the Macroris River. She was on a voyage from Saint Domingo to Liverpool, Lancashire.
New Brunswick	(United Kingdom of Great Britain and Ireland) British North America	The ship was lost in the Gulf of Saint Lawrence. She was on a voyage from Quebec City, Province of Canada to a British port.
Nile	United Kingdom	The passenger ship was wrecked on The Stones, a reef off Godrevy Head on the Atlantic coast of Cornwall, England, with the loss of all aboard. She was sailing from Liverpool to London, England.

== Unknown date ==
List of shipwrecks: Unknown date November 1854
Ship	State	Description
Antoinette Andromache	France	The ship was wrecked between Midia and "Carabarnu", Ottoman Empire.
Bahrî	Egyptian Navy	The ship of the line was driven ashore and wrecked at "Cape Kara Barnu", at the entrance to the Bosphorus, before 9 November with the loss of 650 of her 900 crew.
Coxan	United Kingdom	The brig was abandoned in the Atlantic Ocean. Her crew were rescued by Amazon (United Kingdom). Coxan was on a voyage from Richibucto, New Brunswick, British North America to South Shields, County Durham.
Duncan	United Kingdom	The barque was driven ashore at Essequibo, Dutch Guiana before 9 November. She had become a wreck by 25 November.
Governor Grey	(United Kingdom of Great Britain and Ireland) New Zealand	The schooner hit a sandbar at the mouth of the Whanganui River in a heavy swell and was wrecked.
Grand Tower, and Pacific	United States	The steamships were in collision in the Mississippi River near Memphis, Tennessee. Both vessels sank. All on board were rescued.
Italia	Austrian Empire	The steamship was reported to have been lost with all hands in the Black Sea.
Jessie	United Kingdom	The ship was driven ashore and wrecked at Rattray Head, Aberdeenshire before 6 November. Her crew were rescued. She was on a voyage from Newcastle upon Tyne, Northumberland to Aberdeen.
John Pardera	United Kingdom	The ship was driven ashore at Cape Ibilo, Kingdom of the Two Sicilies. She was on a voyage from Patras, Greece to Liverpool, Lancashire.
Lancaster	United Kingdom	The full-rigged ship was abandoned in the Atlantic Ocean. All on board were rescued by the barque William and Jane (United Kingdom. Lancaster was on a voyage from Quebec City, Province of Canada, British North America to a Channel port.
Marie Melanie	France	The ship was wrecked between Midia and "Carabarnu".
Mefta Cihat	Egyptian Navy	The frigate was wrecked at "Jeni-Ada", on the Black Sea coast before 9 November with the loss on 270 of her 400 crew.
Reward	United Kingdom	The ship was abandoned in the Pacific Ocean. Her crew were rescued by a Danish vessel. She was on a voyage from Callao, Peru to an English port.
Robinsons	United Kingdom	The ship was wrecked on the west point of Prince Edward Island, British North America before 23 November. She was on a voyage from Richibucto to Hull, Yorkshire.
Samuel	France	The ship was wrecked at Point Calomere, India before 29 November. She was on a voyage from the Coromandel Coast, India to Bordeaux, Gironde.
Vesta	United Kingdom	The ship ran aground off Oudeschild, North Holland, Netherlands before 14 November. She was on a voyage from Amsterdam, North Holland to London. She was refloated the next day.
William and Maria	(United Kingdom of Great Britain and Ireland) Guernsey	The ship was driven ashore. She was on a voyage from Cádiz, Spain to the Rio Grande. She was refloated and completed her voyage, arriving on 30 November, but was consequently condemned.
