= Ville de Paris =

Ville de Paris may refer to:

- Paris
- French ship Ville de Paris, several ships
- HMS Ville de Paris
- La Ville de Paris (airship)
- Ville de Paris (department store), Los Angeles, early 20th c.
