= French ship Ville de Paris =

Four ships of the French Navy have borne the name Ville de Paris, in honour of the city of Paris:

- The 90-gun ship of the line Ville de Paris (1764), later upgraded to 104 guns
- Ville de Paris (1803), a 12-gun vessel
- Ville de Paris (1804), a 110-gun ship of the line, lead ship of her class, renamed Commerce de Paris
- Ville de Paris (1851), a 120-gun ship of the line of the Océan class
- Also the ship of the line of the Royal Navy HMS Ville de Paris, launched in 1795, was named in honour of the 1764 vessel
