= French ship Iéna (1814) =

Ship of the line of the French Navy

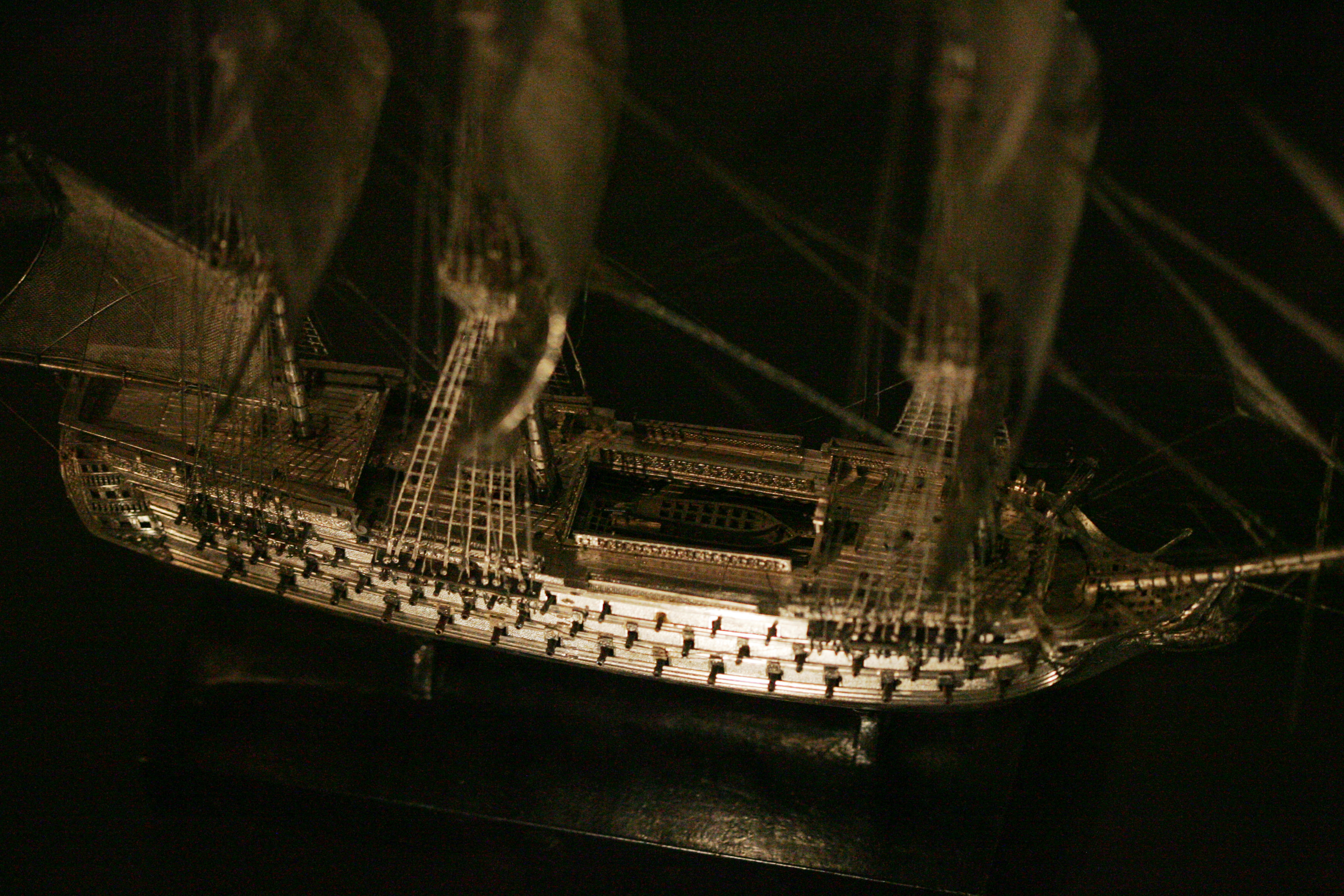
- Silver scale model of Commerce de Paris, sister ship of Iéna, on display at the Musée de la Marine in Paris

History

France
- Name: Iéna
- Namesake: Battle of Jena-Auerstedt
- Builder: Rochefort shipyard
- Laid down: 6 March 1805
- Launched: 30 August 1814
- Commissioned: 26 November 1814
- Decommissioned: 31 December 1864

General characteristics
- Class & type: Commerce de Paris-class ship of the line
- Length: 62.5 m (205 ft 1 in)
- Beam: 16.3 m (53 ft 6 in)
- Draught: 8.1 m (26 ft 7 in)
- Complement: 1,060 men
- Armament: 110 guns (nominally), 114 guns (actual): lower deck: 30 36-pounder guns; middle deck: 32 24-pounder guns; upper deck: 32 12-pounder guns; Castles: 10 8-pounder guns; 10 36-pounder carronades

Iéna was a Commerce de Paris-class 110-gun ship of the line of the French Navy.

She was laid down on 6 March 1805 as Victorieux ("Victorious") at the Arsenal de Rochefort, but renamed Iéna on 23 February 1807, celebrating the French victory over Prussia in the previous autumn's Battle of Jena–Auerstedt. Following the Bourbon Restoration she was renamed Duc d'Angoulême, after Louis Antoine, son of the future King Charles X, and launched on 30 August 1814, entering service on 26 November. The next year, during the Hundred Days, she briefly took back the name of Iéna between March and July. On 9 August 1830, following the July Revolution, she changed name for the last time, back to Iéna.

From 1839 Iéna was sent to the Levant as flagship of Admiral Lalande's squadron during the Oriental Crisis of 1840. From 1854 she took part in the Crimean War, initially stationed off Balchik, Bulgaria. On 14 November, she was driven ashore in the Dardanelles. After refloating, Iéna was converted in 1855 to a troopship with capacity for 1,000 soldiers. Iéna was struck on 31 December 1864, and served as the central hulk for the Toulon reserve fleet until 1915.
