= French ship Orion (1813) =

Ship of the line of the French Navy

- Scale model of Achille, sister ship of French ship Orion (1813), on display at the Musée national de la Marine in Paris.

History

France
- Name: Orion
- Namesake: Orion.
- Builder: Brest
- Laid down: 18 May 1810
- Launched: 9 October 1813
- Commissioned: 22 November 1813
- Decommissioned: 1841
- Fate: Broken up, 1841

General characteristics
- Class & type: Téméraire-class ship of the line
- Displacement: 3,069 tonneaux
- Tons burthen: 1,537 port tonneaux
- Length: 55.87 m (183 ft 4 in)
- Beam: 14.46 m (47 ft 5 in)
- Draught: 7.15 m (23.5 ft)
- Depth of hold: 7.15 m (23 ft 5 in)
- Sail plan: Full-rigged ship
- Crew: 705
- Armament: 74 guns: Lower gun deck: 28 × 36 pdr guns; Upper gun deck: 30 × 18 pdr guns; Forecastle and Quarterdeck: 16–28 × 8 pdr guns and 36 pdr carronades

Orion was a 74-gun Téméraire-class ship of the line built for the French Navy during the 1810s. Completed in 1814, she became a training ship in 1827 and was broken up for scrap in 1841.

== Description ==
Designed by Jacques-Noël Sané, the Téméraire-class ships had a length of 55.87 metres (183 ft 4 in), a beam of 14.46 metres (47 ft 5 in) and a depth of hold of 7.15 metres (23 ft 5 in). The ships displaced 3,069 tonneaux and had a mean draught of 7.15 metres (23 ft 5 in). They had a tonnage of 1,537 port tonneaux. Their crew numbered 705 officers and ratings during wartime. They were fitted with three masts and ship rigged.

The muzzle-loading, smoothbore armament of the Téméraire class consisted of twenty-eight 36-pounder long guns on the lower gun deck and thirty 18-pounder long guns on the upper gun deck. After about 1807, the armament on the quarterdeck and forecastle varied widely between ships with differing numbers of 8-pounder long guns and 36-pounder carronades. The total number of guns varied between sixteen and twenty-eight. The 36-pounder obusiers formerly mounted on the poop deck (dunette) in older ships were removed as obsolete.

== Construction and career ==
Orion was laid down on 18 May 1810 at the Arsenal de Brest and launched on 9 October 1813. The ship was commissioned on 22 November 1813 by Captain Jean-Baptiste Billard and completed in February 1814. Orion was chosen as a school ship for naval cadets of the École navale in Brest on 7 May 1827. She was replaced by Borda in 1840, and struck in 1841.
