= Great Storm of 1854 =

Weather event in the Black Sea

The Great Storm of 1854 occurred in and around the Black Sea on 14 November 1854. It caused severe damage and was a major disruption to armed forces in the region—naval forces especially—engaged in the Crimean War.

== Impact ==
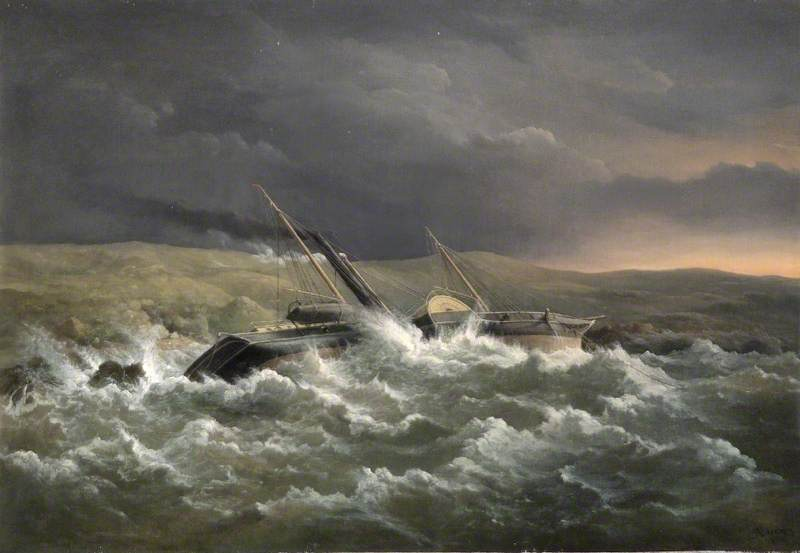
Painting by Richard Brydges Beechey of HMS Danube being battered by the storm while in Kazatch Bay, Sevastopol, Crimea, 14 November 1854.

At the time of the storm, the British and allied supply fleet were in the Black Sea with all of the supplies for the winter military campaign. A strong gale blew up and began battering the fleet. Eyewitness accounts record the flattening of tents and uprooting of trees, and at least 37 ships were either severely damaged or wrecked. Most of the winter supplies were lost, including food, fuel, and winter uniforms. As a result, many men died from hypothermia and disease.

The storm caused a series of scandals. Funds raised to help the troops disappeared, much of it into the pockets of officers. It was also discovered that the storm had been tracked across Europe prior to its arrival off Crimea, but no warning was sent. As a result of this latter occurrence, several countries quickly launched independent meteorological services. In France, Urbain Le Verrier, director of the Observatoire de Paris, was commanded to set up a storm warning system; this later developed into an international meteorological service.

Though it is impossible to precisely calculate the strength or speed of the wind, estimates have placed it around force 11 on the Beaufort Scale.

== See also ==
- List of shipwrecks in November 1854#14 November

== Sources ==
- Kutzbach, K. (1979). The Thermal Theory of Cyclones: A History of Meteorological Thought in the Nineteenth Century. Boston: AMS. ISBN 9781940033808.
- Lindgrén, S.; Neumann, J. (Dec 1980). "Great historical events that were significantly affected by the weather". Bulletin of the American Meteorological Society. 61 (12): 1570–1583. doi:10.1175/1520-0477(1980)061<1570:GHETWS>2.0.CO;2. JSTOR 26221558. S2CID 162351058.
