= Commerce de Paris-class ship of the line =

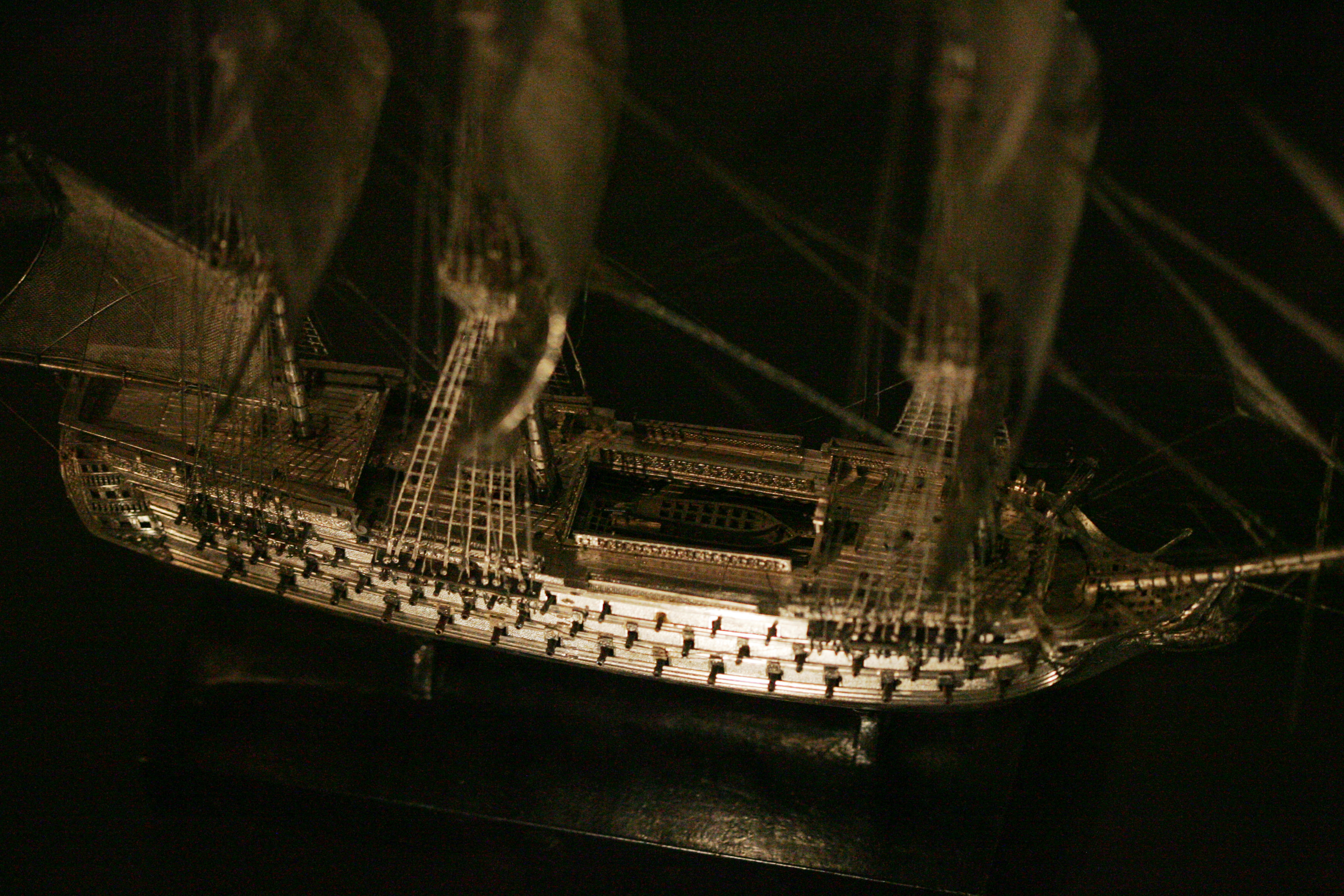
- Scale model of Commerce de Paris

Class overview
- Name: Commerce de Paris
- Builders: Toulon (Commerce de Paris); Rochefort (Iéna); Plans by Jacques-Noël Sané
- Operators: French Navy
- Preceded by: Océan class
- Succeeded by: Valmy
- In service: 15 June 1807 – April 1884
- Planned: 9
- Completed: 2
- Canceled: 7

General characteristics
- Type: 110-gun ship of the line
- Length: 60.42 m (198.2 ft)
- Beam: 16.24 m (53.3 ft)
- Draught: 8.12 m (26.6 ft)
- Complement: 1,069 men
- Armament: 110 guns (originally), 114 guns (later): lower deck: 30 × 36-pounder guns; middle deck: 32 × 24-pounder guns; upper deck: 32 × 12-pounder guns; 'gaillards': 16 × 8-pounder guns (later had 10 × 8-pounders and 10 × 36-pounder carronades)
- Armour: Timber

The Commerce de Paris class were a series of ships of the line of the French Navy, designed in 1804 by Jacques-Noël Sané as a shortened version of his 118-gun Océan-class three-deckers, achieved by removing a pair of guns from each deck so that they became 110-gun ships. Two ships were built to this design in France. Four more were begun at Antwerp in 1810–1811, but these were never completed and were broken up on the ways; three more were ordered in Holland, but these were never laid down.

== Ships ==
- Commerce de Paris

Builder: Toulon shipyard
Ordered: 14 May 1804
Laid down: October 1804
Launched: 8 August 1806
Completed: May 1807
Fate: razeed in 1825. Renamed Commerce on 11 August 1830, then Borda on 18 December 1839 and Vulcain on 18 August 1863; broken up in 1885.

- Duc d'Angoulême

Builder: Rochefort shipyard
Ordered: 8 May 1804
Laid down: April 1805
Launched: 30 August 1814
Completed: January 1815
Fate: Renamed Iéna on 22 March 1815, reverting to Duc d'Angueleme on 15 July 1815; became Iéna again on 9 August 1830; broken up in 1886 (or 1915).

- Monarque (never finished; renamed Wagram on 15 December 1810)

Builder: Antwerp shipyard
Ordered: early 1810 (named 23 July 1810)
Laid down: April 1810
Fate: Sold and broken up on the ways in 1814

- Hymen (never finished)

Builder: Antwerp shipyard
Ordered: early 1810 (named 23 July 1810)
Laid down: May 1810
Fate: Sold and broken up on the ways in 1814

- Neptune (Never finished)

Builder: Antwerp shipyard
Ordered: 15 March 1811 (named 26 August 1811)
Laid down: May 1811
Fate: Sold and broken up on the ways in 1814

- Terrible (Never finished)

Builder: Antwerp shipyard
Ordered: 15 March 1811 (named 26 August 1811)
Laid down: June 1811
Fate: Sold and broken up on the ways in 1814

In October 1811 Napoleon asked for three 110-gun ships to be begun at Amsterdam, but only one was ordered; two more ships to be same design were ordered in 1812 to be built at Amsterdam and at Rotterdam, but none of the three was named or laid down, although prefabrication of the frame for the first had been begun during 1813.
