= French ship Commerce de Paris (1806) =

Ship of the line of the French Navy

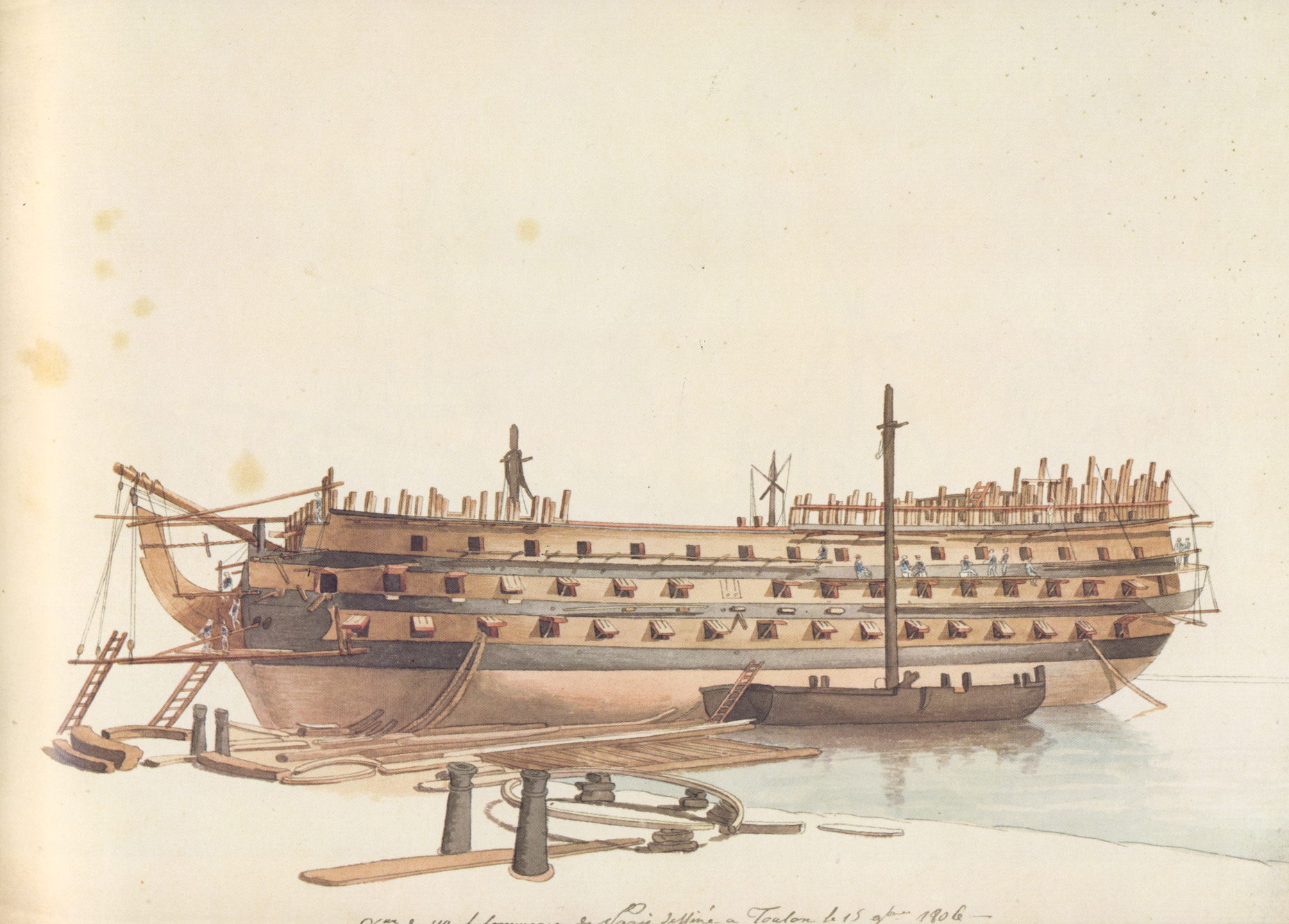
- Commerce de Paris under construction at Toulon on 15 November 1806

History

France
- Name: Commerce de Paris
- Namesake: Paris
- Ordered: 14 May 1804
- Builder: Toulon shipyard, plans by Sané
- Laid down: December 1804
- Launched: 8 August 1806
- Commissioned: 15 June 1807
- Decommissioned: 1 December 1814
- Fate: Scrapped 1885

General characteristics
- Class & type: Commerce de Paris-class ship of the line
- Length: 62.5 m (205 ft 1 in)
- Beam: 16.3 m (53 ft 6 in)
- Draught: 8.1 m (26 ft 7 in)
- Complement: 1,060 men
- Armament: 110 guns: 30 × 36-pounder long guns; 32 × 24-pounder long guns; 30 × 12-pounder long guns; 6 × 8-pounder long guns; 12 × 36-pounder carronades

Commerce de Paris was a 110-gun Commerce de Paris-class ship of the line of the French Navy. She was the lead ship of her class.

== Career ==
She was offered to the French Navy by a subscription of Paris merchants on 27 May 1803 and started as Ville de Paris. She was renamed Commerce de Paris on 21 November 1804.

In 1808, she served as flagship of the Mediterranean Squadron under Vice-admiral Honoré Joseph Antoine Ganteaume and Counter-admiral Julien Cosmao, with Captain Violette as her flag captain. In 1809, Ganteaume transferred on Majestueux. In June 1809, command of Commerce de Paris was transferred to Captain Brouard.

On 29 August 1814, after the Hundred Days, she was transferred from Toulon to Brest, along with Austerlitz and Wagram, where she was decommissioned. From 1822 to 1825, she was razeed by one battery. In 1830, she was renamed Commerce, then Borda in 1839. She was used as a school ship from 1840, replacing Orion. Renamed Vulcain in 1863, she was eventually scrapped in 1885.

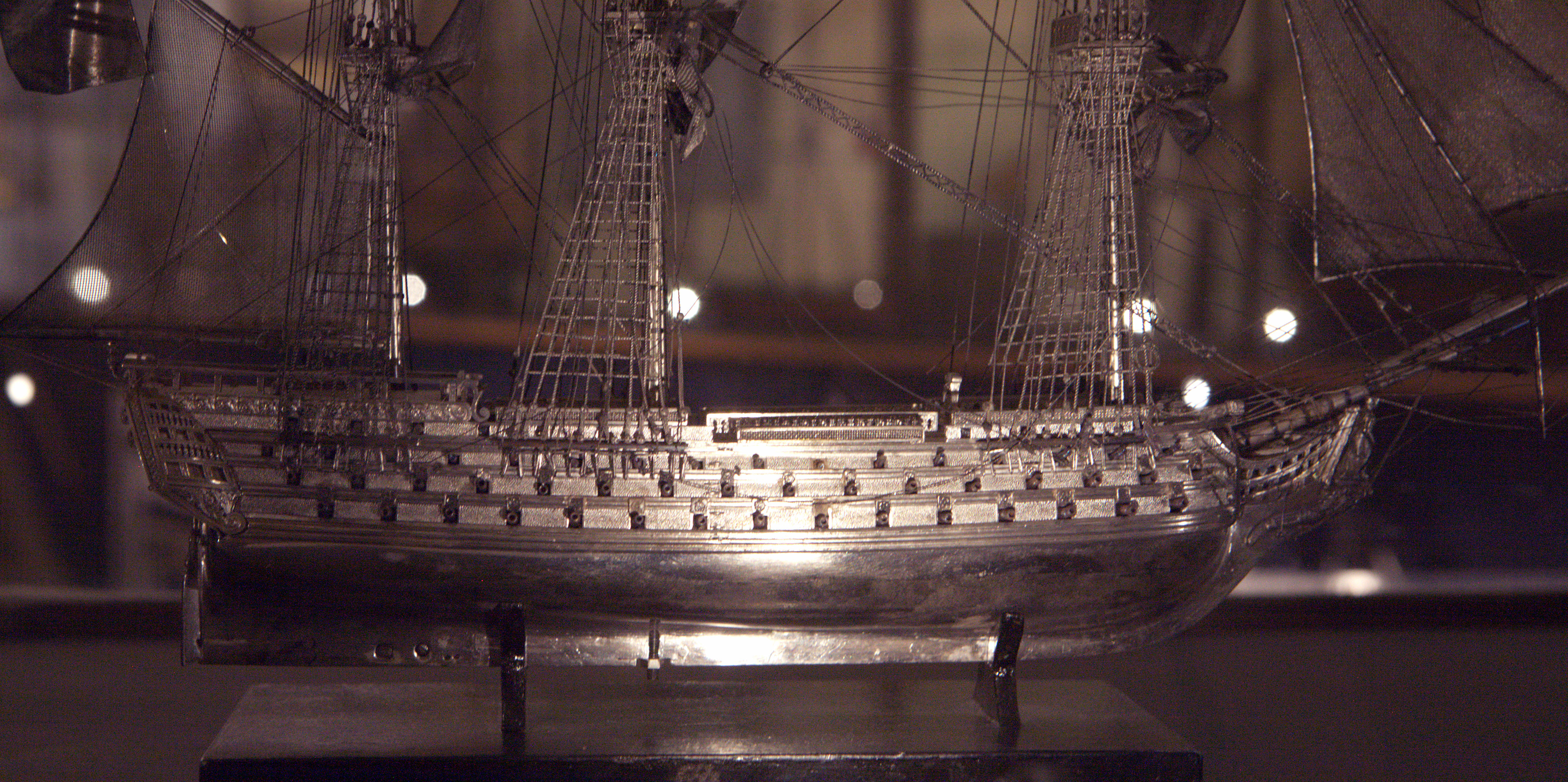
Model of Commerce de Paris

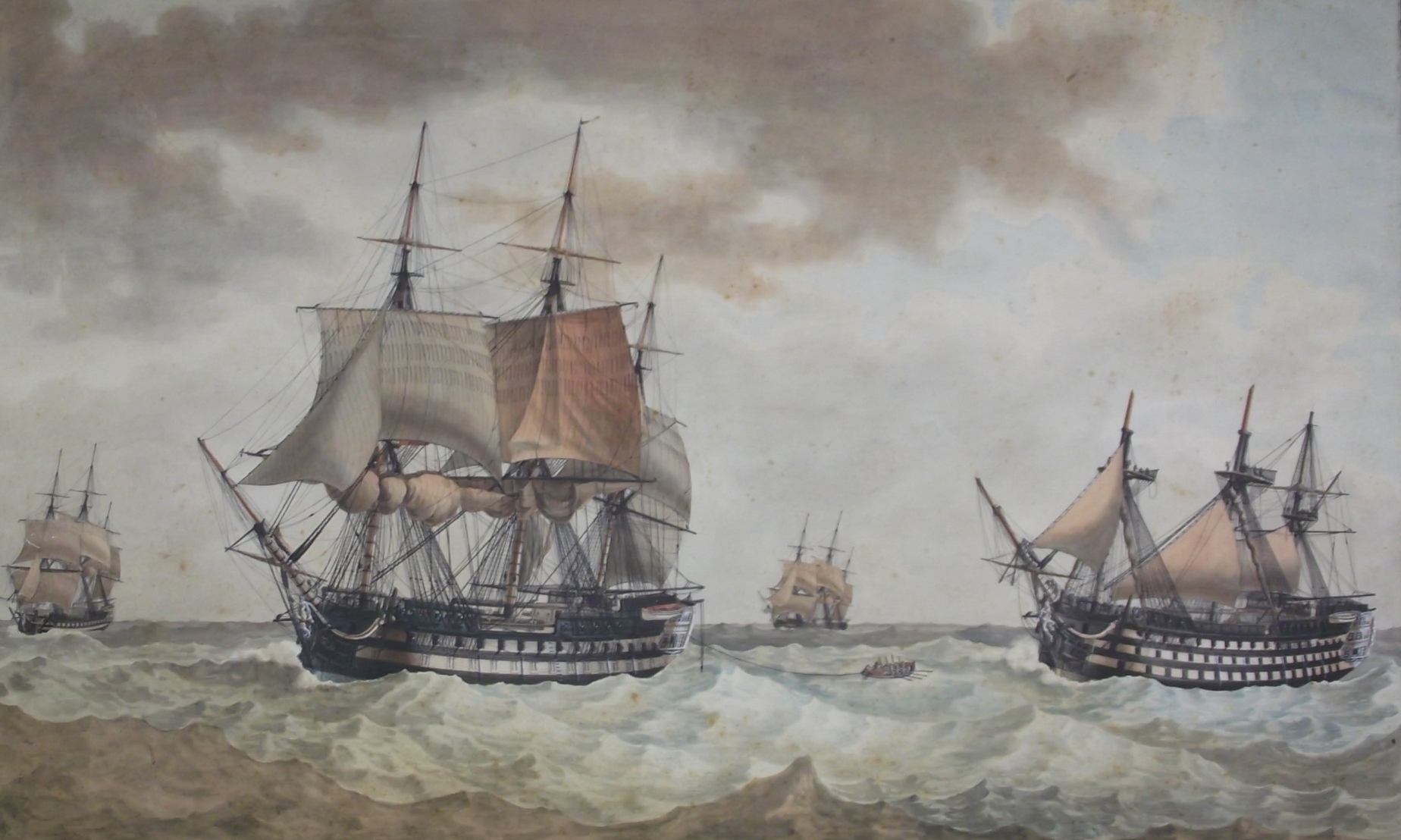
Magnanime towing Commerce de Paris in 1809

== Sources and references ==
=== Bibliography ===
- Roche, Jean-Michel (2005). Dictionnaire des bâtiments de la flotte de guerre française de Colbert à nos jours, 1671 - 1870. Group Retozel-Maury Millau. ISBN 978-2-9525917-0-6. OCLC 165892922.

=== External links ===
- (in French) Les bâtiments ayant porté le nom de Borda, Netmarine.net
- 110/130-gun ships-of-the-line
- Fonds Marine. Campagnes (opérations; divisions et stations navales; missions diverses). Inventaire de la sous-série Marine BB4. Tome premier : BB4 1 à 482 (1790-1826), partie 2
